The 2018 Boston Red Sox season was the 118th season in the team's history, and their 107th season at Fenway Park. Under first year manager Alex Cora, the team finished with a 108–54 record, winning the American League East division title for the third consecutive season, and finished eight games ahead of the second-place New York Yankees. The Red Sox were the first MLB team to post 100 wins during the 2018 season, reaching that milestone for the first time since 1946; they were also the first team to clinch a berth in the 2018 postseason.

The team set a new franchise record for wins in a season by surpassing the prior mark of 105 that had been set in 1912; they also won the most games by any MLB team since the 2001 Seattle Mariners won 116. Mookie Betts finished the season with the Major League batting title, hitting .346, while J. D. Martinez finished second in the majors with .330. Betts also won a Gold Glove and the Major League Baseball Most Valuable Player Award. Closer Craig Kimbrel became the fastest player in history to reach 300 career saves, finishing the season with 333.

The Red Sox entered the postseason as the top seed in the American League, and defeated the Yankees in four games in the Division Series. They then defeated the defending champion Houston Astros in five games in the Championship Series, advancing to the World Series where they defeated the Los Angeles Dodgers in five games.

The team was later accused of electronic sign stealing. An investigation into the allegation stated that the sign stealing was "limited in scope and impact," but nonetheless resulted in the suspension of a team video replay operator and the loss of a second-round draft pick in the 2020 draft for the organization. Regardless, the team has been considered the best MLB team of the 2010s, one of the best Red Sox teams ever, and one of the best baseball teams since the 1998 New York Yankees.

Offseason

October 2017

On October 11, the Red Sox announced that John Farrell would not return as the team's manager for the 2018 season.
On October 22, the Red Sox announced that Alex Cora, who spent 2005–2008 with the club, had signed a three-year deal to become the new manager of the team.
On October 25, it was reported that the Red Sox received approval from the Boston Landmarks Commission to add premium seating next to both dugouts. The seats, later branded the Jim Beam Dugout, became available for the 2018 season, at per-game prices starting at $12,500 for 25 guests.
On October 26, the Cleveland Indians hired pitching coach Carl Willis and the Chicago Cubs hired hitting coach Chili Davis and third base coach Brian Butterfield.

November 2017
 On November 2, the Red Sox named Carlos Febles as their third base coach; Febles has been in the Red Sox organization since 2007, and most recently was manager of the Portland Sea Dogs. The same day, the Red Sox named Ron Roenicke as bench coach; he previously managed the Milwaukee Brewers (2011–2015) and most recently was third base coach of the Los Angeles Angels.
 On November 4, Tim Hyers was named hitting coach of the Red Sox; he was previously with the team from 2013 through 2015 as minor league hitting coordinator, then spent 2016 and 2017 as assistant hitting coach for the Los Angeles Dodgers.
 On November 8, the Red Sox named Dana LeVangie as their pitching coach; LeVangie has been with the Red Sox since 1991; he was a minor league player (1991–1996), bullpen catcher (1997–2004), and a scout (2005–2012) before joining the coaching staff.
 On November 13, the Red Sox hired Craig Bjornson as their bullpen coach; Bjornson had been in the same role with the Houston Astros for the 2014 though 2017 seasons.

December 2017

On December 18, the Red Sox re-signed first baseman Mitch Moreland to a two-year, $13M contract.

January 2018
 On January 22, it was reported that the safety netting at Fenway Park would be extended down both foul lines; to Section 79 in left field and to Section 9 in right field.

February 2018
On February 5—"Truck Day"—equipment for spring training left Fenway Park for JetBlue Park at Fenway South.
On February 14, pitchers and catchers had their first workout at spring training.
On February 18, the Red Sox re-signed IF Eduardo Núñez to a one-year, $4M deal.
On February 19, the team had its first full squad workout at spring training.
On February 22, the team played exhibition games against the Northeastern Huskies and the Boston College Eagles; the Red Sox won both games, by scores of 15–2 and 4–2, respectively.
On February 23, the team played its first Grapefruit League game, against the Minnesota Twins; the Red Sox won, 4–3.
On February 26, the Red Sox announced they signed OF/DH J. D. Martinez to a five-year, $110M deal.
 On February 28, the Red Sox announced that they had filed a petition with the City of Boston to change the name of Yawkey Way—the street where the main entrance of Fenway Park is located—to its original name, Jersey Street. The change was approved in April 2018, and the name reverted in May 2018.

March 2018
On March 24, the Red Sox traded IF Deven Marrero to the Arizona Diamondbacks for a player to be named later or cash considerations.
On March 27, the team played its final spring training game, defeating the Chicago Cubs, 4–2.

Regular season

Opening Day, March 29 at Tampa Bay Rays
The 2018 regular season began on March 29, 2018, against the Tampa Bay Rays at Tropicana Field. Manager Alex Cora named Chris Sale as the Red Sox opening day starter opposite Chris Archer. The Red Sox built a 4–0 lead through seven innings, including an inside-the-park home run by Eduardo Núñez. Sale pitched six innings, giving up just one hit and walking three, while striking out nine. After Matt Barnes held the Rays scoreless in the seventh inning, Joe Kelly and Carson Smith gave up a total of six runs in the eighth inning, allowing Tampa Bay to take a 6–4 lead. Rays closer Álex Colomé pitched a scoreless ninth inning for the save.

Opening Day lineup

March
March 29–March 31, at Tampa Bay Rays
After the tough loss on opening day, David Price made his 2018 debut and threw seven shut-out innings on just 76 pitches. Matt Barnes and Craig Kimbrel shut the door. The lone run of the game was scored by Xander Bogaerts in the seventh. In game three of the four-game series, the baseball was handed to Rick Porcello, who pitched  innings and allowed one run on six hits. Bogaerts went 3-for-4, scored a run, drove in two, and hit his fifth double of the season.

April
April 1, at Tampa Bay Rays (cont.)
For the third game in a row, the Red Sox won the match by the smallest of margins. Héctor Velázquez allowed one run in  innings. Mookie Betts and Jackie Bradley Jr. scored to win the series.
Red Sox won the series 3–1 (10–9 runs)

April 2–April 3, at Miami Marlins
In the series opener, Brian Johnson made his season debut and continued the strong start of Boston's starting pitching. He allowed only one run in six innings, while Hanley Ramírez and Mookie Betts went yard for the first time of the young season. Final score, 7–3 for Boston. The next day, Chris Sale exited the game after five innings with the score tied 1–1, followed by five scoreless frames. The Red Sox scored in the top of the 11th, but the Marlins got a tying run off of Matt Barnes in the bottom of the 11th. Ramírez then drove in Betts and Andrew Benintendi in the top of the 13th, with Heath Hembree picking up the win, 4–2.
Red Sox won the series 2–0 (11–5 runs)

April 5–April 8, vs. Tampa Bay Rays
In the first game of the series, David Price pitched seven innings, giving up no runs on three hits, but the Red Sox had to force extra innings with two runs in the bottom of the ninth. After two scoreless extra frames, Hanley Ramírez hit a bases-loaded single in the bottom of the 12th to give Boston the win, 3–2. After a rare scheduled Friday off-day, Boston jumped out to an 8–2 lead after two innings of the series' second game, en route to a 10–3 victory. In the series' finale on Sunday, Tampa Bay held a 7–2 lead with two outs in the bottom of the eighth; Boston then had six consecutive hits (three singles and three doubles) to take the lead, 8–7. Craig Kimbrel pitched a one-two-three ninth, to give the Red Sox the sweep.
Red Sox won the series 3–0 (21–12 runs)

April 10–April 12, vs. New York Yankees
The Red Sox jumped out to an early lead, then added a nine-run sixth inning, to take the first game of the series, 14–1. The first third of the Boston batting order was a combined 8-for-10 with eight runs and nine RBIs. Boston's winning streak then ended at nine games in a 10–7 loss to Masahiro Tanaka on April 11. The game included an incident where Red Sox relief pitcher Joe Kelly hit Yankees' designated hitter Tyler Austin with a pitch, following an allegedly dirty slide by Austin in which he spiked fielder Brock Holt. Austin charged Kelly and started a bench-clearing brawl; four players, including Kelly and Austin, were ejected. Boston subsequently won the final game of the series, 6–3, with Rick Porcello allowing only two hits in seven shutout innings.
Red Sox won the series 2–1 (27–14 runs)

April 13–April 15, vs. Baltimore Orioles
The Red Sox jumped out to a 4–1 lead in the first inning of the opening game of the series. Eduardo Rodríguez held the Orioles to one run in six innings, en route to a 7–3 win. Boston again took an early lead in the second game; 3–0 at the end of the first, and 8–0 at the end of the fourth. Héctor Velázquez got the win in the 10–3 victory. The third game of the series was tied 1–1 through five innings, with Boston getting the go-ahead run in the sixth on an error and wild pitch, and then an insurance run on a Tzu-Wei Lin ground rule double. Heath Hembree got the win in relief; final score 3–1. The final game of the series—set for Patriots' Day—was rained out and rescheduled for May 17.
Red Sox won the series 3–0 (20–7 runs)

April 17–April 19, at Los Angeles Angels
In the first game of the series, the Red Sox got three early runs off of Shohei Ohtani, who only lasted two innings. Boston added five more in the third, en route to a 10–1 win; Mookie Betts had three home runs. Boston again jumped out to an early lead in the second game; up 6–0 after three, starter Rick Porcello and the bullpen held Los Angeles scoreless, for a 9–0 victory. The final game of the series found Boston up a run, 3–2, at the end of five. The Red Sox then outscored the Angels 5–0 during the final four innings, for an 8–2 win to complete the sweep.
Red Sox won the series 3–0 (27–3 runs)

April 20–April 22, at Oakland Athletics
After a come-from-behind victory in the first game of the series, which extended Boston's winning streak to eight games, the Red Sox were no-hit by Sean Manaea on April 21. Entering the game with a 17–2 record, the Red Sox had the best winning percentage (.895) of any MLB team ever no-hit. It was the first no-hitter against the Red Sox since Chris Bosio of the Seattle Mariners on April 22, 1993. Boston also lost the third and final game of the series; it was the first time the team had consecutive losses during the season.
Red Sox lost the series 1–2 (8–10 runs)

April 24–April 26, at Toronto Blue Jays
In the first game of the series, the Red Sox rallied from a 3–1 deficit in the top of the ninth, and the game went to extra innings. In the bottom of the 10th inning, Curtis Granderson hit a one-out solo home run off of Craig Kimbrel to give the Blue Jays a 4–3 win, extending Boston's losing streak to three games. The Red Sox were able to win the final two games of the series, each by a single run with Kimbrel getting both saves, giving them six wins from their nine-game road trip.
Red Sox won the series 2–1 (12–11 runs)

April 27–April 29, vs. Tampa Bay Rays
After falling behind 4–0 in the first game of the series, the Red Sox rallied but came up a run short, losing 4–3 to the Rays. In the second game of the series, after playing to a 5–5 tie through five innings, the Red Sox gave up seven runs in the final four innings, losing 12–6, their fifth loss in seven games. Boston then won the final game of the series, 4–3.
Red Sox lost the series 1–2 (13–19 runs)

April 30, vs. Kansas City Royals
After giving up three first-inning runs, the Red Sox rallied to a 10–6 win in the opening game of the series. Four runs came on a Xander Bogaerts grand slam, making the 2018 Red Sox only the second team in MLB history, along with the 1996 Montreal Expos, to have six grand slams by May 1. The 19 wins the Red Sox had in April set a new club record; the prior mark was 18, most recently accomplished by the 2013 team.

May

May 1–May 2, vs. Kansas City Royals (cont.)
A blown save by Craig Kimbrel, in giving up a ninth-inning home run to Alex Gordon, sent the second game of the series into extra innings. With the Red Sox down a run in the bottom of the 12th, a home run by Eduardo Núñez tied the game, 4–4. A three-run home run by Jorge Soler in the top of the 13th put the Royals up 7–4, and a Red Sox rally in the bottom of the inning came up a run short, the Royals winning 7–6. The Royals took an early 3–0 lead in the rubber match of the series but the Red Sox tied the game in the fourth with Mookie Betts and J. D. Martinez going yard. Betts then single-handedly won the game for Boston, by taking Danny Duffy deep two more times. This was Betts' fourth three-homer game of his young career, making him the Red Sox' franchise leader for such games, surpassing Ted Williams.
Red Sox won the series 2–1 (21–17 runs)

May 3–May 6, at Texas Rangers
In the series opener, David Price lasted only  innings while giving up nine runs (seven earned) as the Red Sox lost to the Rangers, 11–5. Mookie Betts followed up his three-homer game with a 2-for-4 effort at the plate, including his 12th home run of the season. In the second game of the series, Rick Porcello held the Rangers to three hits and one run in six innings, as the Red Sox won, 5–1. The Red Sox had four home runs; Betts (his fifth in three games), J. D. Martinez, and two by Rafael Devers. After falling behind 4–1 in the third game of the series, the Red Sox came back to win, 6–5, with Craig Kimbrel getting the save, the 300th of his MLB career. In the fourth and final game of the series, Chris Sale held the Rangers to four hits and one run in seven innings of work, en route to a 6–1 Red Sox victory.
Red Sox won the series 3–1 (22–18 runs)

May 8–May 10, at New York Yankees
In the opening game of the series, Boston outhit New York, 8–6, but the Yankees had two solo home runs from Giancarlo Stanton en route to a 3–2 win. It was the Yankees' ninth win in their last ten games, putting them into a tie with the Red Sox atop the AL East, with identical 25–10 records. In the second game of the series, after trailing 4–2 at the end of the third, the Red Sox held a 6–5 lead going into the bottom of the eighth. With runners on first and second with one out, Craig Kimbrel was brought in, for a potential five-out save. A triple by Brett Gardner, followed by an Aaron Judge two-run homer, put the Yankees ahead, 9–6. Aroldis Chapman pitched a scoreless ninth to give the Yankees the win, and first place in the AL East standings. In the final game of the series, the Red Sox held a 4–0 lead going into the bottom of the seventh, with Hanley Ramírez having contributed three RBIs. The Yankees loaded the bases with one out off of Heath Hembree, and were able to push across four runs to tie the game after Joe Kelly came in. The Red Sox re-took the lead in the top of the eighth, on a J. D. Martinez solo home run. Kelly then held the Yankees scoreless in the bottom of the eighth, and Craig Kimbrel pitched a one-two-three ninth, earning his tenth save of the season. The win put the Red Sox back into a tie with the Yankees for first place in the AL East, both teams at 26–11.
Red Sox lost the series 1–2 (13–16 runs)

May 11–May 13, at Toronto Blue Jays
In the first game of the series, Chris Sale became the third Boston pitcher, after Roger Clemens and Pedro Martínez, to have a game with 15 strikeouts while issuing no walks. Sale pitched nine innings of a game that would go 12 innings, with Toronto winning 5–3 on a two-run walk-off home run by Luke Maile off of Brian Johnson. In the second game of the series, David Price pitched  innings, giving up two runs and getting the win, after his scheduled start against the Yankees had been pushed back due to numbness in his throwing hand, which was subsequently diagnosed as a mild case of carpal tunnel syndrome. Hanley Ramírez had a two-run homer en route to a 5–2 Boston win. In the final game of the series, a first-inning two-run home run from J. D. Martinez put Boston ahead early. After starter Drew Pomeranz left with no outs in the fifth inning, the Red Sox bullpen allowed one inherited runner to score, and then held Toronto to no further runs through the end of the game. Joe Kelly picking up his second save of the season, in a Boston 5–3 victory.
Red Sox won the series 2–1 (13–10 runs)

May 14–May 16, vs. Oakland Athletics
The opening game of the series included five solo home runs; three by Oakland and two by Boston. The Red Sox trailed from the fourth inning on, ultimately losing 6–5. Rain delayed the start of the second game of the series by almost two hours. Oakland jumped out to a 2–0 lead in the first inning, and Boston closed the gap to 3–2 after five innings. The Athletics added two runs in the eighth, and although the Red Sox got one run in the ninth, closer Blake Treinen converted his second save in two days as the Athletics won, 5–3. In the third game of the series, Chris Sale handed over a 3–2 lead to the bullpen after five innings, due to a high pitch count (102). Boston again outscored Oakland 3–2 in the final four innings, for a 6–4 final.
Red Sox lost the series 1–2 (14–15 runs)

May 17–May 20, vs. Baltimore Orioles
David Price threw a 95-pitch complete game in the first game of the series, as the Red Sox won, 6–2. Baltimore's only runs came on a Manny Machado two-run homer with two outs in the ninth. With the win, the Red Sox became the first MLB team to reach 30 wins in the 2018 season. The second game of the series was tied at one in the top of the fourth with two outs, when Baltimore scored four runs off of Boston starter Drew Pomeranz. Despite a 3-for-5 effort from Mookie Betts, including his 14th home run of the season, the Red Sox could not make up the deficit; final score 7–4 for the Orioles. In the third game of the series, the Red Sox broke a 1–1 tie with three runs in the fifth inning, on back-to-back home runs from Betts (with Sandy León on base) and Andrew Benintendi. Craig Kimbrel earned his 13th save of the season in closing out the 6–3 victory. In the final game of the series, a pair of J. D. Martinez home runs helped lead Boston to a 5–0 win; the Orioles outhit the Red Sox, 13–12, but were unable to score as they had 14 men left on base.
Red Sox won the series 3–1 (21–12 runs)

May 22–May 24, at Tampa Bay Rays
In the first game of the series, Chris Sale pitched  innings while holding the Rays to two runs (one earned) while striking out nine and walking two. Mookie Betts and Rafael Devers both homered as the Red Sox won, 4–2. The second game of the series was tied 1–1 entering the ninth, when Boston pushed across three runs, aided by an error, walk, and passed ball by Tampa Bay. Closer Craig Kimbrel then retired the Rays in order for his 15th save of the season. Tampa Bay took the final game of the series, 6–3, as Rick Porcello gave up six runs (four earned) in  innings, requiring 92 pitches.
Red Sox won the series 2–1 (11–9 runs)

May 25–May 27, vs. Atlanta Braves
The series' first game was a 6–2 win for the Red Sox, powered by home runs from J. D. Martinez, Xander Bogaerts, Mookie Betts, and Mitch Moreland. Dustin Pedroia was on the active roster for the first time of the season, but did not play in the game. Earlier in the day, in order to open up a roster spot for Pedroia, the team announced that Hanley Ramírez had been designated for assignment. In the second game of the series, neither starting pitcher lasted four innings, and the two teams used a total of nine relief pitchers. Steven Wright was the most effective, pitching three innings of scoreless relief and picking up the win, as the Red Sox rallied from deficits of 3–0 and 5–3 to win, 8–6. Chris Sale had eight strikeouts in  innings of the final game of the series, but was roughed up for six runs by Atlanta, as Boston lost 7–1.
Red Sox won the series 2–1 (15–15 runs)

May 28–May 30, vs. Toronto Blue Jays
In the first game of the series, the Red Sox sent eight men to the plate in the bottom of the fourth, pushing across five runs on the way to an 8–3 victory. David Price gave up four hits and two runs over five innings, picking up the win as the bullpen allowed just one run through the final four innings. Andrew Benintendi had a 3-for-5-day with four RBIs, missing just a double to complete the cycle. The second game of the series also yielded an 8–3 Boston win, as the Red Sox scored in six of the eight innings they batted, including home runs from Benintendi and Sandy León. Rick Porcello improved his record to 7–2, and Craig Kimbrel notched his 17th save. Boston completed the sweep with a 6–4 win in the final game of the series. Toronto tied the game at two in the top of the sixth, and later rallied for two runs in the top of the ninth, before coming up short. J. D. Martinez hit his 18th home run of the 2018 season, putting him into a tie with Mike Trout of the Los Angeles Angels for the MLB lead in that category.
Red Sox won the series 3–0 (22–10 runs)

May 31, at Houston Astros
The Astros scored two first-innings runs on a Carlos Correa home run off of Drew Pomeranz en route to a 4–2 win in the first game of the series.

June

June 1–June 3, at Houston Astros (cont.)
In the second game of the series, Houston had home runs from George Springer, Carlos Correa, and Evan Gattis in their 7–3 win over Boston. J. D. Martinez had his 19th home run of the season, while Mookie Betts was placed on the 10-day disabled list. Trailing by a run entering the seventh inning of the third game of the series, the Red Sox rallied for three runs in the frame on the way to a 5–4 win. A two-run Andrew Benintendi homer provided the winning edge, while Dustin Pedroia was placed on the 10-day disabled list after appearing in only three games since making his season debut on May 26. In the closing game of the series, the Red Sox had 15 hits while Rick Porcello picked up his eighth win of the season in a 9–3 Boston victory. Brock Holt had three RBIs while Benintendi and Mitch Moreland both homered.
Red Sox split the series 2–2 (19–18 runs)

June 5–June 7, vs. Detroit Tigers
In the first game of the series, Steven Wright made a spot start, and pitched seven shutout innings to get the win. Xander Bogaerts and J. D. Martinez both had home runs in support of the 6–0 Boston victory; meanwhile, Drew Pomeranz was placed on the disabled list. Boston won the second game of the series, 7–1, as Andrew Benintendi and Christian Vázquez each had home runs; Vázquez went 3-for-4 with two RBIs and two runs scored. Jalen Beeks made his MLB debut as Red Sox starter in the third game of the series, yielding five first-inning runs to the Tigers, who went on to win, 7–2. Benintendi homered again for Boston, his 11th of the season.
Red Sox won the series 2–1 (15–8 runs)

June 8–June 10, vs. Chicago White Sox
Chris Sale pitched eight innings while striking out ten and allowing just one run in the opening game of the series, but the Red Sox were unable to score and fell to the White Sox, 1–0. In the middle game of the series, home runs from Jackie Bradley Jr. and J. D. Martinez led Boston to a 4–2 win, with David Price improving his record to 7–4. In the closing game, the White Sox held the Red Sox' offense in check, winning 5–2 and giving Chicago the series.
Red Sox lost the series 1–2 (6–8 runs)

June 11–June 13, at Baltimore Orioles
Steven Wright shutout the Orioles for  innings, but neither team could score and the first game of the series went to extra innings. In the 12th inning, the Red Sox pushed across two runs on sacrifice flies, with Craig Kimbrel then closing out the win for his 21st save of the season. Mookie Betts returned from the disabled list, batted leadoff, and went 1-for-5. In the second game of the series, Eduardo Rodríguez improved his record to 8–1 with the win. Boston's 6–4 victory included home runs from Rafael Devers and Andrew Benintendi. The two teams combined for 20 hits and 16 walks in a game that took nearly four hours to complete. The Red Sox completed the sweep with a 5–1 win in the third game of the series; Chris Sale was the winning pitcher while Betts and J. D. Martinez both homered.
Red Sox won the series 3–0 (13–5 runs)

June 14–June 17, at Seattle Mariners
In the series' opening game, starters David Price and Félix Hernández both went seven innings, with the Red Sox holding a 2–1 lead thanks to a sixth-inning home run by Xander Bogaerts. Neither bullpen allowed a run, with Red Sox closer Craig Kimbrel issuing two walks but getting his 22nd save of the season. In the second game of the series, Rick Porcello pitched six innings and left with the Red Sox ahead, 6–4. However, Seattle scored three runs off of the Boston bullpen, for a 7–6 win. All the Red Sox' runs came in the third inning, when they sent 11 men to the plate. Steven Wright, starter of the third game of the series, held Seattle to one run through seven innings, but Boston was limited to two hits and unable to score, as the Red Sox fell 1–0 to the Mariners. In the final game of the series, Boston jumped out to a 5–0 lead in the third inning and never looked back, winning 9–3. Eduardo Rodríguez notched his ninth win of the season, while Bogaerts, Jackie Bradley Jr., and Rafael Devers each homered.
Red Sox split the series 2–2 (17–12 runs)

June 19–June 21, at Minnesota Twins
The first game of the series was tied 2–2 going to the bottom of the eighth inning; the Twins then scored four runs—two each off of Robby Scott and Joe Kelly—as the Red Sox fell, 6–2. In the second game of the series, the Red Sox were held to one run on four hits, while the Twins were powered by home runs from Robbie Grossman and Max Kepler, defeating Boston, 4–1. After being held to three runs in the first two games of the series, the Red Sox offense produced 16 hits and won the final game, 9–2. Rick Porcello improved his record to 9–3, while Mookie Betts and Andrew Benintendi both homered.
Red Sox lost the series 1–2 (12–12 runs)

June 22–June 24, vs. Seattle Mariners
The opening game of the series saw nine runs scored in the first inning, and Seattle led 10–5 entering the fifth inning. Boston outscored Seattle 9–0 the rest of the way, for a 14–10 win. Red Sox starter Steven Wright gave up ten earned runs—raising his season ERA from 1.23 to 3.38—but escaped with a no decision. Nelson Cruz of the Mariners had two home runs and seven RBIs in a losing effort. For the Red Sox, J. D. Martinez went 4-for-5 with a home run and five RBIs, and every batter had at least one hit. In the second game of the series, Seattle again jumped out to an early lead, 5–0 after four innings. This time, there would be no Boston comeback, as it was 7–0 going to the ninth, with the Red Sox only scoring two late runs. Eduardo Rodríguez took the loss, his first since May 15, and only his second of the season. In the closing game of the series, Chris Sale had 13 strikeouts while holding Seattle scoreless through seven innings. The Red Sox bullpen completed the shutout, while Mitch Moreland homered in support of the 5–0 win.
Red Sox won the series 2–1 (21–17 runs)

June 26–June 28, vs. Los Angeles Angels
In the series' first game, Boston had a 5–0 lead after two innings and went on to win, 9–1. David Price improved his record to 9–5, while Mookie Betts, Jackie Bradley Jr., Christian Vázquez, and J. D. Martinez each homered. In the second game of the series, the Red Sox jumped out to a 6–0 lead in the second inning. The Angels fought back to tie it, 6–6, in the seventh, with Boston then scoring three unanswered runs for a 9–6 victory. The two teams used a combined 12 pitchers, with Angels reliever Jake Jewell leaving the game after an apparent ankle injury suffered while trying to make a play at the plate. The Red Sox had home runs from Martinez, Sandy León, and Eduardo Núñez. In the series' final game, Brian Johnson started and left after four innings with the Red Sox trailing, 1–0. Héctor Velázquez then pitched two scoreless innings as Boston took the lead, 2–1, and was credited with the win as the Red Sox stayed ahead for a 4–2 final. Craig Kimbrel got his second consecutive save, bringing his season total to 24. Bradley Jr. and Rafael Devers both homered, as Boston completed the sweep. For the first time in franchise history, the Red Sox swept a season series of 5 or more games and also set a major league record of 20 home run against a single opponent with 6 or fewer games played against in a season.
Red Sox won the series 3–0 (22–9 runs)

June 29–June 30, at New York Yankees
In the first game of the series, New York built a 5–0 lead after four innings, en route to an 8–1 win. Boston starter Eduardo Rodríguez gave up five runs in six innings, taking the loss. The Yankees had four home runs, including two by Greg Bird, while new Red Sox 1B/OF Steve Pearce was 2-for-4 in his debut game with the team. In the middle game of the series, a first-inning grand slam from Rafael Devers put Boston up early, in a game they would go on to win, 11–0. Devers was 5-for-5 at the plate, lacking only a triple for the cycle. Sandy León also homered for the Red Sox, while Chris Sale improved his record to 8–4.

July
July 1, at New York Yankees (cont.)
In the third and final game of the series, the Yankees jumped on David Price early, scoring six first-inning runs. Price went  innings, allowing five homers and eight runs. The Yankees had six home runs, including three from Aaron Hicks, as they defeated Boston, 11–1.
Red Sox lost the series 1–2 (13–19 runs)

July 2–July 4, at Washington Nationals
In the opening game of the series, Rick Porcello drove in three runs with a bases-loaded double in the second inning; he pitched six innings, limiting the Nationals to two runs on seven hits, and got the win, his tenth of the season. Boston's other run in the 4–3 final came on a Mookie Betts home run, with Craig Kimbrel notching his 25th save of the season. In the second game of the series, the Red Sox had a pair of three-run home runs from Eduardo Núñez and Xander Bogaerts, plus a two-run shot from J. D. Martinez, en route to an 11–4 win. On Independence Day, the third game of the series was scoreless through six innings, until Boston score twice in the seventh and once in the ninth, for a 3–0 victory to complete the sweep. Jackie Bradley Jr. had two RBIs, while Eduardo Rodríguez captured his 10th win of the season.
Red Sox won the series 3–0 (18–7 runs)

July 6–July 8, at Kansas City Royals
In the series opener, the Red Sox scored four runs in the first, and another four in the second, jumping out early in what would be a 10–5 win. Mookie Betts, J. D. Martinez, and Xander Bogaerts each homered, while Chris Sale improved his record to 9–4. Tyler Thornburg, acquired by Boston in December 2016 and out for the 2017 season due to surgery, made his Red Sox debut. The second game of the series was tied at four after five innings; the Red Sox then outscored the Royals 11–0, with Royals catcher Drew Butera facing six batters to record the final Boston out in the ninth, for a 15–4 final. Andrew Benintendi had a home run and a double, going 2-for-2 along with four walks, batting behind Betts who went 4-for-6. David Price had a no decision, leaving after  innings, with Heath Hembree picking up the win after pitching  hitless innings in relief. In the final game of the series, Rick Porcello allowed nine hits in seven innings, but held the Royals to three runs and got the win, improving his season record to 11–3. Boston's three-run seventh inning was the difference in the 7–4 final score. Benintendi was 4-for-5 at the plate, while Craig Kimbrel recorded his 27th save of the year.
Red Sox won the series 3–0 (32–13 runs)

July 9–July 11, vs. Texas Rangers
The Red Sox' winning streak was extended to seven games with a 5–0 victory in the opening game of the series. Boston's runs came on a Steve Pearce two-run homer in the first, and a J. D. Martinez three-run homer in the eighth. Eduardo Rodríguez improved his record to 11–3 for the season. In the middle game of the series, the Red Sox sent nine men to the plate in a five-run third inning, and won again, 8–4. Boston used six pitchers in the game, with reliever Matt Barnes getting the win; Héctor Velázquez, making a spot start, left after three innings. A 4–2 Boston win in the final game of the series completed the sweep, with Chris Sale improving his record to 10–4 for the season. Xander Bogaerts was 3-for-4 at the plate including a triple.
Red Sox won the series 3–0 (17–6 runs)

July 12–July 15, vs. Toronto Blue Jays
In the opener of a four-game series, Boston scored all but one of their runs in the fourth inning as they defeated Toronto, 6–4, extending their winning streak to ten games. Mookie Betts hit the team's eighth grand slam of the season, in a 13-pitch at bat—a full count plus seven pitches fouled off—as he went 2-for-4 with five RBIs. With a 66–29 record, the Red Sox reached 37 games over .500 for the first time since 1949. Boston's winning streak came to an end in the second game of the series, a 13–7 loss to Toronto. The two teams used a total of 13 pitchers, as both starters only retired a combined 15 batters. Betts was 3-for-4 at the plate—raising his average to .357 for the season—along with a walk, two RBIs, and two runs scored. The third game of the series went to extra innings, after Boston scored the tying run in the bottom of the ninth on back-to-back doubles by Xander Bogaerts and Jackie Bradley Jr. In the bottom of the tenth, the Red Sox loaded the bases on an error, a single, and an intentional walk. Bogaerts then hit a walk-off grand slam to win the game, 6–2. It was Bogaerts' third grand slam of the season and the Red Sox' ninth. Boston won the final game of series, 5–2, with Bogaerts again homering and Craig Kimbrel getting his 30th save of the season. The Red Sox reached the All-Star break with MLB's best record (68–30, a .694 winning percentage) and a  game lead over the Yankees in the AL East.
Red Sox won the series 3–1 (24–21 runs)

In an 8–6 American League win in 10 innings, four of the five Red Sox all-stars played in the game. Mookie Betts started in right field and was 0-for-3 at the plate, while J. D. Martinez started at DH and was 1-for-2. Chris Sale was the AL starting pitcher, striking out one and allowing one hit in an inning of work. Mitch Moreland was 2-for-3 after entering the game at first base. Closer Craig Kimbrel did not play.

July 20–July 22, at Detroit Tigers
The one and only run in the first game of the series came in the top of the first inning, when Steve Pearce drove in Andrew Benintendi. It was the Red Sox' first 1–0 win since the second game of the season. David Price pitched  scoreless innings for the win, with Craig Kimbrel getting the save. Boston fell to Detroit in the second game of the series, 5–0, despite outhitting the Tigers, 8–7. Starter Brian Johnson took the loss, although both runs he allowed in five innings of work were unearned. The Red Sox won the series' final game, 9–1, with Jackie Bradley Jr. going 2-for-4 with three RBIs, while Chris Sale improved his record to 11–4.
Red Sox won the series 2–1 (10–6 runs)

July 23–July 24, at Baltimore Orioles
A 5–3 win in the first game of the series gave Boston a 71–31 record, reaching 40 games over .500 for the first time since their 1949 season. Rick Porcello pitched six scoreless innings for the win, while Mitch Moreland hit his 12th home run of the season. For the second game of the series, the Red Sox activated Drew Pomeranz from the disabled list; he took the mound for the first time since May 31. Pomeranz allowed four runs in  innings, taking the loss as Baltimore prevailed, 7–6. Trailing 7–3 after five innings, Boston scored twice in the eighth and once in the ninth to nearly force extra innings. J. D. Martinez had two home runs, increasing his total to 31 for the season; Blake Swihart and Mookie Betts had one each. The third and final game of the series was postponed, due to rain. The Red Sox had jumped out to a 5–0 lead—including home runs from Betts, Martinez, and Andrew Benintendi—in two innings of play before the game was halted; however, those statistics are discarded, as the game will be replayed from the start.
Red Sox split the series 1–1 (11–10 runs)

July 26–July 29, vs. Minnesota Twins
Minnesota won the first game of the series, 2–1, with two late runs after Boston had gone out to a 1–0 lead in the second inning. The Red Sox threatened in the bottom of the ninth, loading the bases with two outs, with Twins closer Fernando Rodney striking out Jackie Bradley Jr. to complete the save. In the second game of the series, Boston took a 2–0 lead in the fifth inning via a Bradley Jr. home run. The Twins got back one run in the seventh, and then scored two runs off of closer Craig Kimbrel with two outs in the ninth, to take a 3–2 lead. Rafael Devers forced extra innings with a home run in the bottom of the ninth, and Mookie Betts opened the bottom of the tenth with a walk-off home run, giving the Red Sox a 4–3 win. Boston won the third game of the series, 10–4, with Rick Porcello improving his record to 13–4 for the year. Five Red Sox batters had two hits each, including J. D. Martinez who hit his 32nd home run of the season. Boston won the final game of the series, 3–0, with Martinez going 2-for-4 and driving in all three runs. Recently acquired starting pitcher Nathan Eovaldi made his Red Sox debut, allowing four hits in seven innings while striking out five and issuing no walks.
Red Sox won the series 3–1 (18–9 runs)

July 30–July 31, vs. Philadelphia Phillies
The first game of the series was tied 1–1 at the end of five innings, with no further scoring until the bottom of the 13th, when Blake Swihart drove in Eduardo Núñez for a 2–1 victory. All of Boston's hits came from the bottom four spots in the order, which went a collective 7-for-19. Philadelphia won the second and final game of the series, 3–1. Newly acquired second baseman Ian Kinsler made his Red Sox debut and went 1-for-4. Xander Bogaerts drove in Swihart for Boston's only run.
Red Sox split the series 1–1 (3–4 runs)

August

August 2–August 5, vs. New York Yankees
In the first game of the four game set, the Yankees jumped out to an early 4–0 lead, only to see Boston score the next 10 runs, including eight in the fourth inning, en route to a 15–7 final. Much of the offense came from the top third of the Red Sox order: Mookie Betts was 4-for-4 plus two walks, Andrew Benintendi was 3-for-6 with three RBIs, and Steve Pearce was 3-for-5 with six RBIs; all three of his hits were home runs. Pearce joined Kevin Millar and Mo Vaughn as the only Red Sox players to have a three-homer game against the Yankees. In the second game of the series, Rick Porcello allowed only one run and one hit in a complete game effort, improving his record to 14–4 as the Red Sox won, 4–1. Alex Cora had been ejected in the bottom of the first inning, his first ejection as Boston manager, after taking exception to warnings issued to both dugouts. Boston then scored three runs, with two coming on a Pearce homer. Ian Kinsler had to leave the game due to injury, and was later placed on the disabled list; Betts replaced him at second base for several innings, his first time playing the position since 2014. Boston won the third game of the series, 4–1, with Nathan Eovaldi allowing no runs and three hits in eight innings. Mitch Moreland and J. D. Martinez both hit home runs. The Red Sox completed the four-game sweep in a 10-inning, 5–4 win that was broadcast on Sunday Night Baseball. A Betts solo home run put Boston ahead in the fifth inning; however, New York capitalized on a Xander Bogaerts error in the seventh inning to go ahead, 4–1. With that score, Yankees closer Aroldis Chapman came on in the bottom of the ninth, but struggled, striking out two and walking three. With the bases loaded, a Martinez single cut the lead to 4–3. A Bogaerts grounder then drew an errant throw from Yankees third baseman Miguel Andújar, allowing Jackie Bradley Jr. to score the tying run. The game went to extra innings after Moreland struck out, with Matt Barnes retiring the side in order in the top of the 10th. In the bottom of the 10th, Sandy León hit a two-out single and advanced to second on a wild pitch. Betts was intentionally walked, and Tony Renda made his Red Sox debut as a pinch runner for León. Benintendi then singled to center, scoring Renda, to secure the win and complete the sweep.
Red Sox won the series 4–0 (28–13 runs)

August 7–August 9, at Toronto Blue Jays
The first game of the series found Toronto leading, 3–1, when Boston scored four in the top of the eighth, including three on a J. D. Martinez home run, to take a 5–3 lead. Toronto then forced extra innings, with a run each in the bottom of the eighth and ninth innings. In the top of the tenth, Boston scored five runs, via homers by Mitch Moreland and Jackie Bradley Jr. Toronto could only answer with two runs, for a 10–7 final and fifth consecutive Red Sox win. In the series' second game, Boston jumped out to a 4–0 lead after three innings, ultimately winning 10–5. Rafael Devers hit a home run in his first game back from the disabled list. Boston's winning streak then ended at six games, as Toronto won the final game of the series, 8–5. Rick Porcello gave up seven runs in four innings, taking the loss. Martinez hit his 35th home run of the season, while Mookie Betts' ninth inning homer completed the cycle, the first of his career and first of the 2018 MLB season.
Red Sox won the series 2–1 (25–20 runs)

August 10–August 12, at Baltimore Orioles
In a game with 33 total hits, the Red Sox out-slugged the Orioles, 19–12, in the first game of the series. Trailing 8–5 after five innings, Boston scored six runs in the sixth, three in the seventh, and five in the eighth. Drew Pomeranz, pitching out of the bullpen, got the win, while Brock Holt went 3-for-4 with three RBIs. Holt, Xander Bogaerts, and Andrew Benintendi each homered. J. D. Martinez had two RBIs, giving him 101 for the season. The second game of the series—the first game of a day-night doubleheader to make-up a July 25 rainout—was won by Boston, 5–0. David Price pitched six shutout innings, while Jackie Bradley Jr. hit two home runs and Eduardo Núñez also homered. In the second game of the doubleheader, Boston used seven pitchers en route to a 6–4 win. Martinez hit two home runs, giving him 37 for the season, while Craig Kimbrel recorded his 34th save of the year. Boston won the fourth and final game of the series, 4–1, with Chris Sale recording the win in his return from the disabled list. Steve Pearce homered, and Kimbrel picked up his second save in two days.
Red Sox won the series 4–0 (34–17 runs)

August 14–August 15, at Philadelphia Phillies
Rick Porcello pitched seven innings, holding the Phillies to two hits and one run, as the Red Sox won the opener of a two-game set, 2–1. Boston's runs came on solo homers by Sandy León and pinch hitter Brock Holt. The Phillies won the second game, 7–4, their three-run seventh inning being the difference. Mitch Moreland had three RBIs on a bases-loaded double.
Red Sox split the series 1–1 (6–8 runs)

August 17–August 19, vs. Tampa Bay Rays
In the opening game of the series, Tampa Bay scored three times in the top of the first inning, but was held scoreless for the rest of the game, as Boston won, 7–3. Xander Bogaerts had two doubles and a triple, going 3-for-4 with two RBIs. In the second game of the series, the Red Sox jumped out to a 4–0 lead after the first inning, in what would be a 5–2 win. J. D. Martinez hit his 38th home run of the season, and David Price improved his record to 13–6. Tampa Bay kept Boston scoreless in the closing game of the series, 2–0, as the Red Sox were held to two hits.
Red Sox won the series 2–1 (12–7 runs)

August 20–August 23, vs. Cleveland Indians
In their first series with the Indians during 2018, Boston lost the first game, 5–4, after building a 3–0 lead through two innings. The Indians had three home runs off of Red Sox starter Rick Porcello, who took the loss. In the second game of the series, Cleveland collected 13 hits en route to a 6–3 win, giving Boston their third consecutive loss for only the second time during the season, the first being in April. Starter Nathan Eovaldi took the loss. A five-run fourth inning helped Boston win the third game of the series, 10–4. Mitch Moreland had a home run, while Xander Bogaerts hit two. In the final game of the series, David Price pitched eight shutout innings, as the Red Sox won, 7–0. Boston sent 11 men to the plate in the fifth inning, scoring six times.
Red Sox split the series 2–2 (24–15 runs)

August 24–August 26, at Tampa Bay Rays
This three-game series was played on Players Weekend, when MLB players are allowed and encouraged to put nicknames on the back of their uniforms. For the opening game, the nicknames used by Boston's starting lineup were as follows:

Boston out-hit Tampa Bay, 13–12, in the first game of the series, but lost, 10–3. All of Boston's hits were singles, and the team had 11 men left on base. J. D. Martinez and Xander Bogaerts were each 3-for-5 at the plate. In the second game of the series, the Red Sox took a 1–0 lead in the second inning, but were then held scoreless as the Rays won, 5–1. In the closing game of the series, Boston was held to three hits, falling 9–1 to Tampa Bay, marking the first time the Red Sox were swept in a series during the season.
Red Sox lost the series 0–3 (5–24 runs)

August 28–August 29, vs. Miami Marlins

In the first game of the series, Boston took a 4–1 lead into the eighth inning, when Miami scored five runs off of the Red Sox bullpen. Trailing 6–4, Boston then scored three in the bottom of the eighth to retake the lead, 7–6. In the top of the ninth, the Marlins tied the game at seven, with a run off of closer Craig Kimbrel. The Red Sox then won the game in the bottom of the ninth when the Marlins were unable to turn a double play on an Eduardo Núñez ground ball, allowing J. D. Martinez to score on a throwing error. In the second and final game of the series, Boston trailed, 5–3, going to the bottom of the seventh, when they erupted for 11 runs on 12 hits. This marked the first time a major league team recorded hits on 12 consecutive at bats in a single inning. A walk and a sacrifice bunt occurred, but those are only considered plate appearances, not at bats. The sequence was: single, double, single, double, double, sacrifice bunt, triple, intentional walk, single, single, single, double, single, single, followed by a ground ball yielding a double play that ended the inning. The Red Sox sent 15 men to the plate, with five batters collecting two hits each. Tyler Thornburg recorded the win in relief, with the final score being 14–6. Both Eduardo Núñez and Mookie Betts hit home runs during the game. 
Red Sox won the series 2–0 (22–13 runs)

August 30–August 31, at Chicago White Sox
In the opener of a four-game series, Boston fell behind, 4–0, until scoring nine unanswered runs; four in the seventh inning and five in the ninth inning. Ian Kinsler went 3-for-4, while Mookie Betts and J. D. Martinez both homered. Ryan Brasier notched his first MLB win, one of four Boston relievers who each pitched a scoreless inning. The second game of the series included a two-hour rain delay, as Boston was outhit by Chicago, 14–5, and lost the game, 6–1. Boston's only run was a homer by Andrew Benintendi. Xander Bogaerts was ejected for the first time in his career, following an eighth-inning strikeout.

September
September 1–September 2, at Chicago White Sox (cont.)

In the third game of a four-game series, Eduardo Rodríguez returned from the disabled list and got the win, striking out 12 in  innings, as the Red Sox won, 6–1. Eduardo Núñez, Jackie Bradley Jr., and Ian Kinsler each hit home runs. Chicago won the final game of the series, 8–0, as Boston was held to five hits, and did not have a runner advance past second base.
Red Sox split the series 2–2 (16–19 runs)

September 3–September 5, at Atlanta Braves
The Red Sox won the series' opening game, 8–2, after holding a 3–2 lead at the end of seven innings and then scoring five unanswered runs in the final two frames. The two teams combined to use 14 pitchers; Brandon Workman got the win in relief. Ian Kinsler went 2-for-5 with three RBIs. In the second game of the series, Atlanta established an early 1–0 lead, but was held scoreless after the second inning, as Boston won, 5–1. Steve Pearce was 3-for-4 with three RBIs, and starter Rick Porcello improved his season record to 16–7. Boston completed the sweep in a come-from-behind victory in the third game of the series. Down 7–1 after seven innings, the Red Sox rallied for six runs in the top of the eighth to tie the game. After the Braves scored once in the bottom of the eighth on a solo home run by Freddie Freeman, a two-run home run by Brandon Phillips in the top of the ninth gave the Red Sox a 9–8 lead. Craig Kimbrel closed out the win in the bottom of the ninth with his 38th save of the season. Phillips, who was making his Red Sox debut, was 1-for-3 with two walks, two RBIs, and three runs scored.
Red Sox won the series 3–0 (22–11 runs)

September 7–September 9, vs. Houston Astros
The Astros won the first game of the series, 6–3, after being held scoreless through the first six innings. Starter David Price had 10 strikeouts in  innings and was charged with two runs, although all of Houston's runs were scored with Red Sox relief pitchers on the mound. Xander Bogaerts hit his 20th home run of the season. The Astros won the second game, 5–3, after building a 5–1 lead through four innings. Eduardo Rodríguez took the loss, allowing five runs in  innings, while Bogaerts again homered. Boston won the closing game of the series, 6–5, with Mitch Moreland hitting a walk-off RBI single in the bottom of the ninth to break a 5–5 tie. The Red Sox had built a 5–1 lead through five innings, only to see the Astros plate four runs in the sixth to tie the game. J. D. Martinez hit his 40th home run of the season, while Bogaerts was 4-for-4 with a walk and an RBI. Mookie Betts went 7-for-12 during the series, raising his average to .342 for the season.
Red Sox lost the series 1–2 (12–16 runs)

September 11–September 13, vs. Toronto Blue Jays
In the first game of the series, Toronto had a 2–0 lead through six innings, with Boston then scoring seven unanswered runs for a 7–2 final. Chris Sale returned from the disabled list, pitching the first inning as the Red Sox used seven pitchers in relief, with Ryan Brasier getting the win. Brock Holt hit a three-run pinch-hit home run, as the Red Sox became the first major league team to clinch a spot in the 2018 postseason. Boston won the second game of the series, 1–0, with the game's only run coming on a wild pitch in the fifth inning. Starter David Price went seven innings while striking out seven, walking none, and limiting the Blue Jays to three hits. With this win, the Red Sox reached 100 wins for the first time since their 1946 season. In the final game of the series, J. D. Martinez hit his 41st homer of the season to tie for the MLB lead. Toronto scored twice in the top of the eighth inning to tie the game, 3–3. Boston went ahead, 4–3, in the bottom of the inning, with Xander Bogaerts scoring from third on an infield error. Craig Kimbrel then retired the Blue Jays in order for his 40th save of the season.
Red Sox won the series 3–0 (12–5 runs)

September 14–September 16, vs. New York Mets

The Red Sox were held scoreless in the first game of the series, losing 8–0 as Mets starter Noah Syndergaard allowed only three hits in seven innings. In the second game of the series, Boston overcame a 3–1 deficit, scoring four runs in the fifth inning on two-RBI doubles by Jackie Bradley Jr. and Brock Holt, for a 5–3 final. Steve Pearce was 3-for-4 at the plate, while Rick Porcello improved his record to 17–7 for the season. In the final game of the series, Boston scored three runs in the third inning, with two of those runs coming on a home run by Holt, en route to a 4–3 win. The Red Sox used a total of seven pitchers, with starter Chris Sale going three innings and getting a no decision.
Red Sox won the series 2–1 (9–14 runs)

September 18–September 20, at New York Yankees
In the opening game of the three-game series, Red Sox starter Nathan Eovaldi held the Yankees scoreless through six innings. However, his gem was wasted as Neil Walker hit a three-run home run off of Ryan Brasier in the seventh inning, and the Yankees went on to win, 3–2. New York took the second game of the series, 10–1, with first baseman Luke Voit going 4-for-4 at the plate including three RBIs on two home runs. Boston won the closing game of the series, 11–6, with homers from Brock Holt, Jackie Bradley Jr., and Mookie Betts. The win gave the Red Sox the American League East division title, for the third consecutive season.
Red Sox lost the series 1–2 (14–19 runs)

September 21–September 23, at Cleveland Indians
Sam Travis and Tzu-Wei Lin hit their first major league home runs for Boston in a 7–5 victory in the opener, a game that saw Matt Barnes pick up his sixth win of the season after starter Chris Sale pitched  innings, giving up two earned runs and striking out seven. Cleveland won the second game of the series, 5–4, in 11 innings. Drew Pomeranz took the loss in relief, with Rafael Devers and Blake Swihart hitting home runs for Boston. The third game of the series was again an 11-inning Cleveland win, 4–3. Mookie Betts went 4-for-6, including his 31st home run of the season; William Cuevas allowed only one run in  innings of relief, but took the loss.
Red Sox lost the series 1–2 (14–14 runs)

September 24–September 26, vs. Baltimore Orioles

The Red Sox won their 106th game of the season, setting a new franchise record, with a 6–2 victory in the opening game of the series. Starting pitcher Nathan Eovaldi allowed one run in five innings and got the win, while Mookie Betts hit his 32nd home run of the season. The second game of the series, postponed a day due to rain, saw the Red Sox score early and often, en route to a 19–3 victory. Baltimore starting pitcher Ryan Meisinger lasted only one-third of an inning while giving up five runs. David Price got the win for Boston, while J. D. Martinez, Xander Bogaerts, and Blake Swihart each had home runs and Rafael Devers went 4-for-5 including two homers and six RBIs. Betts had his 30th stolen base of the season, making him the 40th player in MLB history with at least 30 homers and 30 steals in a season, joining the 30–30 club. The Orioles won the final game of the series, 10–3, scoring seven unanswered runs after the game was tied at three at the end of the fifth inning, just their 3rd win against the Red Sox all season.
Red Sox won the series 2–1 (28–15 runs)

September 28–September 30, vs. New York Yankees
In the first game of the final regular season series, the Yankees defeated the Red Sox, 11–6, after jumping out to an 8–0 lead after four innings. Steve Pearce had five RBIs, including Boston's tenth grand slam of the year. New York's win gave them home field advantage for the 2018 American League Wild Card Game. New York also took the second game, 8–5, their 100th win of the season. Brock Holt homered for Boston. The Red Sox won the final game of the series and their regular season, 10–2. Xander Bogaerts and J. D. Martinez both homered, with Eduardo Rodríguez picking up the win as Boston used eight pitchers. Mookie Betts went 1-for-2 and finished the season with a .346 average, while Martinez finished with 43 home runs and 130 RBIs.
Red Sox lost the series 1–2 (21–21 runs)

Postseason

American League Division Series vs. New York Yankees

Boston entered the Division Series as the top seed in the American League, facing New York, the AL Wild Card Game winner. This was the first ALDS meeting between the teams (playoff structure before 2012 precluded teams in the same division from meeting before the Championship Series). After splitting the first two games at Fenway Park, the Red Sox won the next two games at Yankee Stadium, eliminating New York and sending Boston on to the ALCS.

The Red Sox' 16–1 defeat of the Yankees in Game 3, during a misty evening in The Bronx, included two historical footnotes. Firstly, the fifteen-run margin of victory for Boston accounted for the Yankees' worst-ever postseason defeat. The Red Sox failed to score in only the first, fifth, and sixth innings, and generated 7 of their 16 runs in the fourth inning, chasing starter Luis Severino and batting through the order. In addition, Brock Holt hit for the cycle, the first player ever to do so in an MLB postseason game, capping off his performance with a ninth-inning home run against catcher Austin Romine, brought in to pitch when the New York bullpen was overtaxed.

Game 1, October 5 at Fenway Park

Game 2, October 6 at Fenway Park

Game 3, October 8 at Yankee Stadium

Game 4, October 9 at Yankee Stadium

American League Championship Series vs. Houston Astros

Boston faced Houston in the Championship Series, a matchup of 100-win teams, and a rematch of the 2017 ALDS, which was won by Houston. After losing Game 1 at Fenway, the Red Sox won the next four games, including three played in Houston, to eliminate the Astros and advance to the World Series. Game 1 starter Chris Sale had a stomach issue during the week, which included brief hospital stay, and manager Alex Cora decided not to have him start Game 5. David Price started in his place and held Houston scoreless through six innings while allowing just three hits and striking out nine. It was Price's first win in 12 career postseason starts. Jackie Bradley Jr., who had nine RBIs in the series on three hits (a double and two home runs), was named ALCS MVP.

Game 1, October 13 at Fenway Park

Game 2, October 14 at Fenway Park

Game 3, October 16 at Minute Maid Park

Game 4, October 17 at Minute Maid Park

Game 5, October 18 at Minute Maid Park

World Series vs. Los Angeles Dodgers

The Red Sox and Dodgers franchises met in the World Series for the second time; the first was a Boston win in 1916. Game 1 was highlighted by neither Chris Sale nor Clayton Kershaw making it through the fifth inning, and a pinch hit three-run home run by Eduardo Núñez, as Boston won, 8–4. Game 2 starter David Price held the Dodgers to two runs on three hits in six innings, while striking out five, picking up his second win of the postseason, as the Red Sox won, 4–2. Game 3 became the longest game in World Series history, both in innings (18) and by time (7 hours and 20 minutes). Nathan Eovaldi pitched six innings in relief, allowing only two hits prior to a walk-off home run by Max Muncy for a 3–2 Dodgers win. Eduardo Rodríguez started Game 4, holding the Dodgers scoreless through five innings, but then yielding four runs in the sixth. The Red Sox stormed back with help from Mitch Moreland and Steve Pearce, scoring nine runs in the final three innings, winning the game, 9–6, for a 3–1 series lead. Game 5 started with three first-inning runs, with Boston holding a 2–1 edge. There was no further scoring until the Red Sox scored one run in each of the sixth, seventh, and eighth innings. Price, pitching on short rest, held the Dodgers to one run on three hits in seven innings. The game ended in a 5–1 final for Boston, the franchise's fourth World Series championship in 15 years. Price got the win, his second of the World Series and third of the postseason. Pearce had three RBIs on two home runs in the game, giving him a total of three home runs and eight RBIs in the series—he was named World Series MVP. The team's motto during the season, "do damage", became "damage done" upon their victory.

Game 1, October 23 at Fenway Park

Game 2, October 24 at Fenway Park

Game 3, October 26 at Dodger Stadium

Game 4, October 27 at Dodger Stadium

Game 5, October 28 at Dodger Stadium

Postseason rosters

| style="text-align:left" |
Pitchers: 17 Nathan Eovaldi 22 Rick Porcello 24 David Price 32 Matt Barnes 35 Steven Wright  37 Heath Hembree  41 Chris Sale 44 Brandon Workman 46 Craig Kimbrel 56 Joe Kelly 57 Eduardo Rodríguez 70 Ryan Brasier
Catchers: 3 Sandy León 7 Christian Vázquez 23 Blake Swihart 
Infielders: 2 Xander Bogaerts 5 Ian Kinsler 11 Rafael Devers 12 Brock Holt 18 Mitch Moreland 25 Steve Pearce 36 Eduardo Núñez 
Outfielders: 16 Andrew Benintendi 19 Jackie Bradley Jr. 50 Mookie Betts 
Designated hitters: 28 J. D. Martinez
|- valign="top"

| style="text-align:left" |
Pitchers: 17 Nathan Eovaldi 22 Rick Porcello 24 David Price 32 Matt Barnes 37 Heath Hembree 41 Chris Sale 44 Brandon Workman 46 Craig Kimbrel 56 Joe Kelly 57 Eduardo Rodríguez 70 Ryan Brasier
Catchers: 3 Sandy León 7 Christian Vázquez 23 Blake Swihart
Infielders: 2 Xander Bogaerts 5 Ian Kinsler 11 Rafael Devers 12 Brock Holt 18 Mitch Moreland 25 Steve Pearce 36 Eduardo Núñez
Outfielders: 16 Andrew Benintendi 19 Jackie Bradley Jr. 50 Mookie Betts 
Designated hitters: 28 J. D. Martinez
|- valign="top"

| style="text-align:left" |
Pitchers: 17 Nathan Eovaldi 22 Rick Porcello 24 David Price 31 Drew Pomeranz 32 Matt Barnes 37 Heath Hembree 41 Chris Sale 46 Craig Kimbrel 56 Joe Kelly 57 Eduardo Rodríguez 70 Ryan Brasier
Catchers: 3 Sandy León 7 Christian Vázquez 23 Blake Swihart
Infielders: 2 Xander Bogaerts 5 Ian Kinsler 11 Rafael Devers 12 Brock Holt 18 Mitch Moreland 25 Steve Pearce 36 Eduardo Núñez
Outfielders: 16 Andrew Benintendi 19 Jackie Bradley Jr. 50 Mookie Betts 
Designated hitters: 28 J. D. Martinez
|- valign="top"

Season standings

American League East

American League Wild Card

Red Sox team leaders

 Minimum 3.1 plate appearances per team games played
AVG qualified batters: Benintendi, Betts, Bogaerts, Bradley, Martinez, Nuñez

 Minimum 1 inning pitched per team games played
ERA & WHIP qualified pitchers: Porcello, Price

Record against opponents

Roster

MLB debuts
Red Sox players who made their MLB debuts during the 2018 regular season:
 March 31: Bobby Poyner
 April 1: Marcus Walden
 June 7: Jalen Beeks

Transactions
Notable transactions of/for players on the 40-man roster during the 2018 regular season:
 April 23: Pitcher Roenis Elías was traded to the Seattle Mariners for cash or a PTBNL; the Red Sox later received minor league OF/1B Eric Filia; however, he failed his physical and was returned to the Mariners, with cash considerations completing the trade.
 May 25: First baseman Hanley Ramírez was designated for assignment.
 June 28: OF/1B Steve Pearce was acquired from the Toronto Blue Jays for minor league infielder Santiago Espinal.
 July 25: Pitcher Jalen Beeks was traded to the Tampa Bay Rays for pitcher Nathan Eovaldi.
 July 30: Second baseman Ian Kinsler was acquired from the Los Angeles Angels for Triple-A pitchers Ty Buttrey and Williams Jerez.

Amateur draft
Boston's first 15 selections in the 2018 MLB draft, held on June 4–6, are listed below.

 Elih Marrero is the son of former MLB player Eli Marrero.

 Nicholas Lucky did not sign; he chose to attend Coastal Carolina.

Game log

|- style="text-align:center; background-color:#fbb;"
| 1 || March 29 || @ Rays || 4–6 || Pruitt (1–0) || Smith (0–1) || Colomé (1) || Tropicana Field || 31,042 || 0–1 || L1
|- style="text-align:center; background-color:#bfb;"
| 2 || March 30 || @ Rays || 1–0 || Price (1–0) || Roe (0–1) || Kimbrel (1) || Tropicana Field || 19,203 || 1–1 || W1
|- style="text-align:center; background-color:#bfb;"
| 3 || March 31 || @ Rays || 3–2 || Porcello (1–0) || Kittredge (0–1) || Kimbrel (2) || Tropicana Field || 17,838 || 2–1 || W2
|- style="text-align:center; background-color:#bfb;"
| 4 || April 1 || @ Rays || 2–1 || Velázquez (1–0) || Alvarado (0–1) || Kelly (1) || Tropicana Field || 14,256 || 3–1 || W3
|- style="text-align:center; background-color:#bfb;"
| 5 || April 2 || @ Marlins || 7–3 || Johnson (1–0) || Richards (0–1) ||—|| Marlins Park || 11,113 || 4–1 || W4
|- style="text-align:center; background-color:#bfb;"
| 6 || April 3 || @ Marlins || 4–2 (13) || Hembree (1–0) || Guerrero (0–1) ||—|| Marlins Park || 14,953 || 5–1 || W5
|- style="text-align:center; background-color:#bfb;"
| 7 || April 5 || Rays || 3–2 (12) || Poyner (1–0) || Kittredge (0–2) ||—|| Fenway Park || 36,134 || 6–1 || W6
|- style="text-align:center; background-color:#bfb;"
| 8 || April 7 || Rays || 10–3 || Porcello (2–0) || Faria (0–1) ||—|| Fenway Park || 31,821 || 7–1 ||W7
|- style="text-align:center; background-color:#bfb"
| 9 || April 8 || Rays || 8–7 || Smith (1–1) || Colomé (0–1) || Kimbrel (3) || Fenway Park || 31,979 || 8–1 || W8
|- style="text-align:center; background-color:#bfb"
| 10 || April 10 || Yankees || 14–1 || Sale (1–0) || Severino (2–1) ||—|| Fenway Park || 32,357 || 9–1 || W9
|- style="text-align:center; background-color:#fbb"
| 11 || April 11 || Yankees || 7–10 || Tanaka (2–1) || Price (1–1) ||—|| Fenway Park || 32,400 || 9–2 || L1
|- style="text-align:center; background-color:#bfb"
| 12 || April 12 || Yankees || 6–3 || Porcello (3–0) || Gray (1–1) || Kimbrel (4) || Fenway Park || 36,341 || 10–2 || W1
|- style="text-align:center; background-color:#bfb"
| 13 || April 13 || Orioles || 7–3 || Rodríguez (1–0) || Tillman (0–3) ||—|| Fenway Park || 32,610 || 11–2 || W2
|- style="text-align:center; background-color:#bfb"
| 14 || April 14 || Orioles || 10–3 || Velázquez (2–0) || Cobb (0–1) || Walden (1) || Fenway Park || 33,584 || 12–2 || W3
|- style="text-align:center; background-color:#bfb"
| 15 || April 15 || Orioles || 3–1 || Hembree (2–0) || Bundy (0–2) || Kimbrel (5) || Fenway Park || 32,489 || 13–2 || W4
|- style="text-align:center; background-color:#bbb"
|—|| April 16 || Orioles || colspan=8|Postponed (rain). Makeup date May 17.
|- style="text-align:center; background-color:#bfb;"
| 16 || April 17 || @ Angels || 10–1 || Price (2–1) || Ohtani (2–1) ||—|| Angel Stadium || 44,822 || 14–2 || W5
|- style="text-align:center; background-color:#bfb;"
| 17 || April 18 || @ Angels || 9–0 || Porcello (4–0) || Skaggs (2–1) ||—|| Angel Stadium || 34,508 || 15–2 || W6
|- style="text-align:center; background-color:#bfb;"
| 18 || April 19 || @ Angels || 8–2 || Rodríguez (2–0) || Tropeano (1–1) ||—|| Angel Stadium || 36,253 || 16–2 || W7
|- style="text-align:center; background-color:#bfb;"
| 19 || April 20 || @ Athletics || 7–3 || Velázquez (3–0) || Graveman (0–4) ||—|| Oakland Coliseum || 23,473 || 17–2 || W8
|- style="text-align:center; background-color:#fbb;"
| 20 || April 21 || @ Athletics || 0–3 || Manaea (3–2) || Sale (1–1) ||—|| Oakland Coliseum || 25,746 || 17–3 || L1
|- style="text-align:center; background-color:#fbb;"
| 21 || April 22 || @ Athletics || 1–4 || Treinen (1–1) || Price (2–2) ||—|| Oakland Coliseum || 29,804 || 17–4 || L2
|- style="text-align:center; background-color:#fbb;"
| 22 || April 24 || @ Blue Jays || 3–4 (10)|| Clippard (3–0) || Kimbrel (0–1) ||—|| Rogers Centre || 20,070 || 17–5 || L3
|- style="text-align:center; background-color:#bfb;"
| 23 || April 25 || @ Blue Jays || 4–3 || Rodríguez (3–0) || Barnes (1–1) || Kimbrel (6) || Rogers Centre || 18,914 || 18–5 || W1
|- style="text-align:center; background-color:#bfb;"
| 24 || April 26 || @ Blue Jays || 5–4 || Sale (2–1) || Estrada (2–2) || Kimbrel (7) || Rogers Centre || 23,571 || 19–5 || W2
|- style="text-align:center; background-color:#fbb"
| 25 || April 27 || Rays || 3–4 || Snell (4–1) || Pomeranz (0–1) || Colomé (5) || Fenway Park || 32,620 || 19–6 || L1
|- style="text-align:center; background-color:#fbb"
| 26 || April 28 || Rays || 6–12 || Yarbrough (1–1) || Price (2–3) ||—|| Fenway Park || 35,795 || 19–7 || L2
|- style="text-align:center; background-color:#bfb"
| 27 || April 29 || Rays || 4–3 || Kimbrel (1–1) || Colomé (2–3) ||—|| Fenway Park || 32,888 || 20–7 || W1
|- style="text-align:center; background-color:#bfb"
| 28 || April 30 || Royals || 10–6 || Velázquez (4–0) || Hammel (0–3) ||—|| Fenway Park || 31,314 || 21–7 || W2
|-

|- style="text-align:center; background-color:#fbb"
| 29 || May 1 || Royals || 6–7 (13)|| Herrera (1–0) || Johnson (1–1) || Flynn (1) || Fenway Park || 34,466 || 21–8 || L1
|- style="text-align:center; background-color:#bfb"
| 30 || May 2 || Royals || 5–4 || Pomeranz (1–1) || Duffy (0–4) || Kimbrel (8) || Fenway Park || 32,267 || 22–8 || W1
|- style="text-align:center; background-color:#fbb;"
| 31 || May 3 || @ Rangers || 5–11 || Minor (3–1) || Price (2–4) ||—|| Globe Life Park || 22,348 || 22–9 || L1
|- style="text-align:center; background-color:#bfb;"
| 32 || May 4 || @ Rangers || 5–1 || Porcello (5–0) || Colón (1–1) ||—|| Globe Life Park || 31,404 || 23–9 || W1
|- style="text-align:center; background-color:#bfb;"
| 33 || May 5 || @ Rangers || 6–5 || Kelly (1–0) || Kela (2–2) || Kimbrel (9) || Globe Life Park || 35,728 || 24–9 || W2
|- style="text-align:center; background-color:#bfb;"
| 34 || May 6 || @ Rangers || 6–1 || Sale (2–1) || Fister (1–3) ||—|| Globe Life Park || 28,360 || 25–9 || W3
|- style="text-align:center; background-color:#fbb;"
| 35 || May 8 || @ Yankees || 2–3 || Robertson (3–1) || Hembree (2–1) || Chapman (8) || Yankee Stadium || 45,773 || 25–10 || L1
|- style="text-align:center; background-color:#fbb;"
| 36 || May 9 || @ Yankees || 6–9 || Holder (1–1) || Barnes (0–1) || Chapman (9) || Yankee Stadium || 47,088 || 25–11 || L2
|- style="text-align:center; background-color:#bfb;"
| 37 || May 10 || @ Yankees || 5–4 || Kelly (2–0) || Betances (1–2) || Kimbrel (10) || Yankee Stadium || 46,899 || 26–11 || W1
|- style="text-align:center; background-color:#fbb;"
| 38 || May 11 || @ Blue Jays || 3–5 (12)|| Gaviglio (1–0) || Johnson (1–2) ||—|| Rogers Centre || 28,695 || 26–12 || L1
|- style="text-align:center; background-color:#bfb;"
| 39 || May 12 || @ Blue Jays || 5–2 ||Price (3–4) || Estrada (2–3) ||Kimbrel (11)|| Rogers Centre || 37,588 || 27–12 || W1
|- style="text-align:center; background-color:#bfb;"
| 40 || May 13 || @ Blue Jays || 5–3 || Velázquez (5–0) || Biagini (0–2) || Kelly (2) || Rogers Centre || 37,888 || 28–12 || W2
|- style="text-align:center; background-color:#fbb"
| 41 || May 14 || Athletics || 5–6 || Manaea (5–4) || Porcello (5–1) || Treinen (7) || Fenway Park || 35,249 || 28–13 || L1
|- style="text-align:center; background-color:#fbb"
| 42 || May 15 || Athletics || 3–5 || Mengden (3–4) || Rodríguez (3–1) || Treinen (8) || Fenway Park || 34,906 || 28–14 || L2
|- style="text-align:center; background-color:#bfb"
| 43 || May 16 || Athletics || 6–4 || Sale (4–1) || Cahill (1–2) || Kimbrel (12) || Fenway Park || 34,947 || 29–14 || W1
|- style="text-align:center; background-color:#bfb"
| 44 || May 17 || Orioles || 6–2 || Price (4–4) || Gausman (3–3) ||—|| Fenway Park || 36,615 || 30–14 || W2
|- style="text-align:center; background-color:#fbb"
| 45 || May 18 || Orioles || 4–7 || Cobb (1–5) || Pomeranz (1–2) || Brach (6) || Fenway Park || 34,935 || 30–15 || L1
|- style="text-align:center; background-color:#bfb"
| 46 || May 19 || Orioles || 6–3 || Porcello (6–1) || Bundy (2–6) || Kimbrel (13) || Fenway Park || 34,195 || 31–15 || W1
|- style="text-align:center; background-color:#bfb"
| 47 || May 20 || Orioles || 5–0 || Rodríguez (4–1) || Hess (1–1) ||—|| Fenway Park || 35,550 || 32–15 || W2
|- style="text-align:center; background-color:#bfb;"
| 48 || May 22 || @ Rays || 4–2 || Sale (5–1) || Faria (3–3) || Kimbrel (14) || Tropicana Field || 10,642 || 33–15 || W3
|- style="text-align:center; background-color:#bfb;"
| 49 || May 23 || @ Rays || 4–1 || Kelly (3–0) || Colomé (2–5) || Kimbrel (15) || Tropicana Field || 10,194 || 34–15 || W4
|- style="text-align:center; background-color:#fbb;"
| 50 || May 24 || @ Rays || 3–6 || Snell (6–3) || Porcello (6–2) || Colomé (11) || Tropicana Field || 12,468 || 34–16 || L1
|- style="text-align:center; background-color:#bfb"
| 51 || May 25 || Braves || 6–2 || Rodríguez (5–1) || Teherán (4–2) ||—|| Fenway Park || 37,008 || 35–16 || W1
|- style="text-align:center; background-color:#bfb"
| 52 || May 26 || Braves || 8–6 || Wright (1–0) || Freeman (1–2) || Kimbrel (16) || Fenway Park || 36,510 || 36–16 || W2
|- style="text-align:center; background-color:#fbb"
| 53 || May 27 || Braves || 1–7 || Foltynewicz (4–3) || Sale (5–2) ||—|| Fenway Park || 36,543 || 36–17 || L1
|- style="text-align:center; background-color:#bfb"
| 54 || May 28 || Blue Jays || 8–3 || Price (5–4) || Sanchez (2–5) ||—|| Fenway Park || 34,700 || 37–17 || W1
|- style="text-align:center; background-color:#bfb"
| 55 || May 29 || Blue Jays || 8–3 || Porcello (7–2) || Estrada (2–6) || Kimbrel (17) || Fenway Park || 33,380 || 38–17 || W2
|- style="text-align:center; background-color:#bfb"
| 56 || May 30 || Blue Jays || 6–4 || Rodríguez (6–1) || Gaviglio (2–1) || Kimbrel (18) || Fenway Park || 33,451 || 39–17 || W3
|- style="text-align:center; background-color:#fbb;"
| 57 || May 31 || @ Astros || 2–4 || McCullers (7–3) || Pomeranz (1–3) || Giles (10) || Minute Maid Park || 30,658 || 39–18 || L1
|-

|- style="text-align:center; background-color:#fbb;"
| 58 || June 1 || @ Astros || 3–7 || Cole (6–1) || Sale (5–3) ||—|| Minute Maid Park || 37,244 || 39–19 || L2
|- style="text-align:center; background-color:#bfb;"
| 59 || June 2 || @ Astros || 5–4 || Price (6–4) || Harris (1–3) || Kimbrel (19) || Minute Maid Park || 38,640 || 40–19 || W1
|- style="text-align:center; background-color:#bfb;"
| 60 || June 3 || @ Astros || 9–3 || Porcello (8–2) || Morton (7–1) ||—|| Minute Maid Park || 33,431 || 41–19 || W2
|- style="text-align:center; background-color:#bfb"
| 61 || June 5 || Tigers || 6–0 || Wright (2–0) || Lewicki (0–1) ||—|| Fenway Park || 34,762 || 42–19 || W3
|- style="text-align:center; background-color:#bfb"
| 62 || June 6 || Tigers || 7–1 || Rodríguez (7–1) || Hardy (2–1) ||—|| Fenway Park || 35,182 || 43–19 || W4
|- style="text-align:center; background-color:#fbb"
| 63 || June 7 || Tigers || 2–7 || Boyd (4–4) || Beeks (0–1) ||—|| Fenway Park || 36,556 || 43–20 || L1
|- style="text-align:center; background-color:#fbb"
| 64 || June 8 || White Sox || 0–1 || Covey (2–1) || Sale (5–4) || Soria (7) || Fenway Park || 36,593 || 43–21 || L2
|- style="text-align:center; background-color:#bfb"
| 65 || June 9 || White Sox || 4–2 || Price (7–4) || Rondón (0–1) || Kimbrel (20) || Fenway Park || 36,675 || 44–21 || W1
|- style="text-align:center; background-color:#fbb"
| 66 || June 10 || White Sox || 2–5 || López (2–4) || Porcello (8–3) || Soria (8) || Fenway Park || 36,998 || 44–22 || L1
|- style="text-align:center; background-color:#bfb;"
| 67 || June 11 || @ Orioles || 2–0 (12) || Hembree (3–1) || Givens (0–3) || Kimbrel (21) || Camden Yards || 15,934 || 45–22 || W1
|- style="text-align:center; background-color:#bfb;"
| 68 || June 12 || @ Orioles || 6–4 || Rodríguez (8–1) || Hess (2–3) ||—|| Camden Yards || 21,837 || 46–22 || W2
|- style="text-align:center; background-color:#bfb;"
| 69 || June 13 || @ Orioles || 5–1 || Sale (6–4) || Ramírez (0–1) ||—|| Camden Yards || 17,217 || 47–22 || W3
|- style="text-align:center; background-color:#bfb;"
| 70 || June 14 || @ Mariners || 2–1 || Price (8–4) || Hernández (6–6) || Kimbrel (22) || Safeco Field || 30,479 || 48–22 || W4
|- style="text-align:center; background-color:#fbb;"
| 71 || June 15 || @ Mariners || 6–7 || Cook (1–0) || Barnes (0–2) || Díaz (26) || Safeco Field || 44,459 || 48–23 || L1
|- style="text-align:center; background-color:#fbb;"
| 72 || June 16 || @ Mariners || 0–1 || LeBlanc (3–0) || Wright (2–1) || Díaz (27) || Safeco Field || 44,151 || 48–24 || L2
|- style="text-align:center; background-color:#bfb;"
| 73 || June 17 || @ Mariners || 9–3 || Rodríguez (9–1) || Leake (7–4) ||—|| Safeco Field || 46,462 || 49–24 || W1
|- style="text-align:center; background-color:#fbb;"
| 74 || June 19 || @ Twins || 2–6 || Duke (3–2) || Scott (0–1) ||—|| Target Field || 28,550 || 49–25 || L1
|- style="text-align:center; background-color:#fbb;"
| 75 || June 20 || @ Twins || 1–4 || Lynn (5–5) || Price (8–5) || Rodney (16) || Target Field || 33,153 || 49–26 || L2
|- style="text-align:center; background-color:#bfb;"
| 76 || June 21 || @ Twins || 9–2 || Porcello (9–3) || Gibson (2–5) ||—|| Target Field || 32,631 || 50–26 || W1
|- style="text-align:center; background-color:#bfb"
| 77 || June 22 || Mariners || 14–10 || Barnes (1–2) || Nicasio (1–4) ||—|| Fenway Park || 37,342 || 51–26 || W2
|- style="text-align:center; background-color:#fbb"
| 78 || June 23 || Mariners || 2–7 || Leake (8–4) || Rodríguez (9–2) ||—|| Fenway Park || 36,051 || 51–27 || L1
|- style="text-align:center; background-color:#bfb"
| 79 || June 24 || Mariners || 5–0 || Sale (7–4) || Gonzales (7–5) ||—|| Fenway Park || 36,274 || 52–27 || W1
|- style="text-align:center; background-color:#bfb"
| 80 || June 26 || Angels || 9–1 || Price (9–5) || Lamb (0–1) ||—|| Fenway Park || 37,366 || 53–27 || W2
|- style="text-align:center; background-color:#bfb"
| 81 || June 27 || Angels || 9–6 || Barnes (2–2) || Álvarez (3–3) || Kimbrel (23) || Fenway Park || 37,521 || 54–27 || W3
|- style="text-align:center; background-color:#bfb"
| 82 || June 28 || Angels || 4–2 || Velázquez (6–0) || Barría (5–4) || Kimbrel (24) || Fenway Park || 36,992 || 55–27 || W4
|- style="text-align:center; background-color:#fbb;"
| 83 || June 29 || @ Yankees || 1–8 || Sabathia (5–3) || Rodríguez (9–3) ||—|| Yankee Stadium || 47,120 || 55–28 || L1
|- style="text-align:center; background-color:#bfb;"
| 84 || June 30 || @ Yankees || 11–0 || Sale (8–4) || Gray (5–6) ||—|| Yankee Stadium || 47,125 || 56–28 || W1
|-

|- style="text-align:center; background-color:#fbb;"
| 85 || July 1 || @ Yankees || 1–11 || Severino (13–2) || Price (9–6) ||—|| Yankee Stadium || 46,795 || 56–29 || L1
|- style="text-align:center; background-color:#bfb"
| 86 || July 2 || @ Nationals || 4–3 || Porcello (10–3) || Scherzer (10–5) || Kimbrel (25) || Nationals Park || 39,002 || 57–29 || W1
|- style="text-align:center; background-color:#bfb"
| 87 || July 3 || @ Nationals || 11–4 || Workman (1–0) || Roark (3–10) ||—|| Nationals Park || 42,531 || 58–29 || W2
|- style="text-align:center; background-color:#bfb"
| 88 || July 4 || @ Nationals || 3–0 || Rodríguez (10–3) || Madson (2–4) || Kimbrel (26) || Nationals Park || 42,528 || 59–29 || W3
|- style="text-align:center; background-color:#bfb;"
| 89 || July 6 || @ Royals || 10–5 || Sale (9–4) || Hammel (2–11) ||—|| Kauffman Stadium || 24,673 || 60–29 || W4
|- style="text-align:center; background-color:#bfb;"
| 90 || July 7 || @ Royals || 15–4 ||Hembree (4–1) ||Adam (0–2) ||—||Kauffman Stadium || 30,347 || 61–29 || W5
|- style="text-align:center; background-color:#bfb;"
| 91 || July 8 || @ Royals || 7–4 || Porcello (11–3) || Fillmyer (0–1) || Kimbrel (27) || Kauffman Stadium || 28,443 || 62–29 || W6
|- style="text-align:center; background-color:#bfb"
| 92 || July 9 || Rangers || 5–0 || Rodríguez (11–3) || Minor (6–5) ||—|| Fenway Park || 36,754 || 63–29 || W7
|- style="text-align:center; background-color:#bfb"
| 93 || July 10 || Rangers || 8–4 || Barnes (3–2) || Gallardo (3–1) ||—|| Fenway Park || 36,883 || 64–29 || W8
|- style="text-align:center; background-color:#bfb"
| 94 || July 11 || Rangers || 4–2 || Sale (10–4) || Colón (5–7) || Kimbrel (28) || Fenway Park || 36,920 || 65–29 || W9
|- style="text-align:center; background-color:#bfb"
| 95 || July 12 || Blue Jays || 6–4 || Price (10–6) || Happ (10–6) || Kimbrel (29) || Fenway Park || 37,182 || 66–29 || W10
|- style="text-align:center; background-color:#fbb"
| 96 || July 13 || Blue Jays || 7–13 || Petricka (1–0) || Porcello (11–4) ||—|| Fenway Park || 37,018 || 66–30 || L1
|- style="text-align:center; background-color:#bfb"
| 97 || July 14 || Blue Jays || 6–2 (10) || Kimbrel (2–1) || Rowley (0–1) ||—|| Fenway Park || 36,390 || 67–30 || W1
|- style="text-align:center; background-color:#bfb"
| 98 || July 15 || Blue Jays || 5–2 || Workman (2–0) || Stroman (2–7) || Kimbrel (30) || Fenway Park || 36,940 || 68–30 || W2
|- style="text-align:center; background-color:#bfb;"
| 99 || July 20 || @ Tigers || 1–0 || Price (11–6) || Boyd (4–9) || Kimbrel (31) || Comerica Park || 33,817 || 69–30 || W3
|- style="text-align:center; background-color:#fbb;"
| 100 || July 21 || @ Tigers || 0–5 || Fiers (7–6) || Johnson (1–3) ||—|| Comerica Park || 31,682 || 69–31 || L1
|- style="text-align:center; background-color:#bfb;"
| 101 || July 22 || @ Tigers || 9–1 || Sale (11–4) || Hardy (3–3) ||—|| Comerica Park || 25,012 || 70–31 || W1
|- style="text-align:center; background-color:#bfb;"
| 102 || July 23 || @ Orioles || 5–3 || Porcello (12–4) || Gausman (4–8) || Kimbrel (32) || Camden Yards || 16,885 || 71–31 || W2
|- style="text-align:center; background-color:#fbb;"
| 103 || July 24 || @ Orioles || 6–7 || Ramírez (1–3) || Pomeranz (1–4) || Brach (11) || Camden Yards || 13,342 || 71–32 || L1
|- style="text-align:center; background-color:#bbb;"
|—|| July 25 || @ Orioles || colspan=8|Postponed (rain). Makeup date August 11.
|- style="text-align:center; background-color:#fbb"
| 104 || July 26 || Twins || 1–2 || Gibson (5–7) || Barnes (3–3) || Rodney (22) || Fenway Park || 37,439 || 71–33 || L2
|- style="text-align:center; background-color:#bfb"
| 105 || July 27 || Twins || 4–3 (10) || Thornburg (1–0) || Belisle (1–1) ||—|| Fenway Park || 37,273 || 72–33 || W1
|- style="text-align:center; background-color:#bfb"
| 106 || July 28 || Twins || 10–4 || Porcello (13–4) || Odorizzi (4–7) ||—|| Fenway Park || 36,798 || 73–33 || W2
|- style="text-align:center; background-color:#bfb"
| 107 || July 29 || Twins || 3–0 || Eovaldi (4–4) || Berríos (10–8) || Kimbrel (33) || Fenway Park || 36,785 || 74–33 || W3
|- style="text-align:center; background-color:#bfb"
| 108 || July 30 || Phillies || 2–1 (13) || Velázquez (7–0) || Davis (1–1) ||—|| Fenway Park || 37,722 || 75–33 || W4
|- style="text-align:center; background-color:#fbb"
| 109 || July 31 || Phillies || 1–3 || Arrieta (9–6) || Pomeranz (1–5) || Domínguez (11) || Fenway Park || 37,816 || 75–34 || L1
|-

|- style="text-align:center; background-color:#bfb"
| 110 || Aug 2 || Yankees || 15–7 || Johnson (2–3) || Holder (1–2) ||—|| Fenway Park || 37,317 || 76–34 || W1
|- style="text-align:center; background-color:#bfb"
| 111 || Aug 3 || Yankees || 4–1 || Porcello (14–4) || Severino (14–5) ||—|| Fenway Park || 37,231 || 77–34 || W2
|- style="text-align:center; background-color:#bfb"
| 112 || August 4 || Yankees || 4–1 || Eovaldi (5–4) || Adams (0–1) ||—|| Fenway Park || 36,699 || 78–34 || W3
|- style="text-align:center; background-color:#bfb"
| 113 || August 5 || Yankees || 5–4 (10) || Barnes (4–3) || Holder (1–3) ||—|| Fenway Park || 37,830 || 79–34 || W4
|- style="text-align:center; background-color:#bfb;"
| 114 || August 7 || @ Blue Jays || 10–7 (10) || Kimbrel (3–1) || Giles (0–3) ||—|| Rogers Centre || 31,855 || 80–34 || W5
|- style="text-align:center; background-color:#bfb;"
| 115 || August 8 || @ Blue Jays || 10–5 || Johnson (3–3) || Hauschild (1–1) ||—|| Rogers Centre || 36,798 || 81–34 || W6
|- style="text-align:center; background-color:#fbb;"
| 116 || August 9 || @ Blue Jays || 5–8 || Borucki (2–2) || Porcello (14–5) ||—|| Rogers Centre || 28,415 || 81–35 || L1
|- style="text-align:center; background-color:#bfb;"
| 117 || August 10 || @ Orioles || 19–12 || Pomeranz (2–5) || Castro (2–7) ||—|| Camden Yards || 23,649 || 82–35 || W1
|- style="text-align:center; background-color:#bfb;"
| 118 || August 11 (1) || @ Orioles || 5–0 || Price (12–6) || Yacabonis (0–1) ||—|| Camden Yards || 18,003 || 83–35 || W2
|- style="text-align:center; background-color:#bfb;"
| 119 || August 11 (2) || @ Orioles || 6–4 || Kelly (4–0) || Wright (3–1) || Kimbrel (34) || Camden Yards || 24,051 || 84–35 || W3
|- style="text-align:center; background-color:#bfb;"
| 120 || August 12 || @ Orioles || 4–1 || Sale (12–4) || Cobb (3–15) || Kimbrel (35) || Camden Yards || 25,303 || 85–35 || W4
|- style="text-align:center; background-color:#bfb;"
| 121 || August 14 || @ Phillies || 2–1 || Porcello (15–5) || Hunter (3–2) || Kimbrel (36) || Citizens Bank Park || 33,081 || 86–35 || W5
|- style="text-align:center; background-color:#fbb;"
| 122 || August 15 || @ Phillies || 4–7 || Hunter (4–2) || Kelly (4–1) || Domínguez (13) || Citizens Bank Park || 35,266 || 86–36 || L1
|- style="text-align:center; background-color:#bfb"
| 123 || August 17 || Rays || 7–3 || Johnson (4–3) || Chirinos (1–5) ||—|| Fenway Park || 37,012 || 87–36 || W1
|- style="text-align:center; background-color:#bfb"
| 124 || August 18 || Rays || 5–2 || Price (13–6) || Glasnow (1–3) || Kimbrel (37) || Fenway Park || 36,654 || 88–36 || W2
|- style="text-align:center; background-color:#fbb"
| 125 || August 19 || Rays || 0–2 || Beeks (2–1) || Velázquez (7–1) || Romo (16) || Fenway Park || 37,242 || 88–37 || L1
|- style="text-align:center; background-color:#fbb"
| 126 || August 20 || Indians || 4–5 || Kluber (16–6) || Porcello (15–6) || Allen (25) || Fenway Park || 37,274 || 88–38 || L2
|- style="text-align:center; background-color:#fbb"
| 127 || August 21 || Indians || 3–6 || Bieber (7–2) || Eovaldi (5–5) || Hand (29) || Fenway Park || 37,188 || 88–39 || L3
|- style="text-align:center; background-color:#bfb"
| 128 || August 22 || Indians || 10–4 || Barnes (5–3) || Carrasco (15–7) ||—|| Fenway Park || 37,107 || 89–39 || W1
|- style="text-align:center; background-color:#bfb"
| 129 || August 23 || Indians || 7–0 || Price (14–6) || Plutko (4–4) ||—|| Fenway Park || 37,396 || 90–39 || W2
|- style="text-align:center; background-color:#fbb;"
| 130 || August 24 || @ Rays || 3–10 || Beeks (3–1) || Velázquez (7–2) ||—|| Tropicana Field || 19,723 || 90–40 || L1
|- style="text-align:center; background-color:#fbb;"
| 131 || August 25 || @ Rays || 1–5 || Stanek (2–3) || Porcello (15–7) ||—|| Tropicana Field || 25,695 || 90–41 || L2
|- style="text-align:center; background-color:#fbb;"
| 132 || August 26 || @ Rays || 1–9 || Snell (16–5) || Eovaldi (5–6) ||—|| Tropicana Field || 23,448 || 90–42 || L3
|- style="text-align:center; background-color:#bfb"
| 133 || August 28 || Marlins || 8–7 || Kimbrel (4–1) || Steckenrider (4–3) ||—|| Fenway Park || 36,708 || 91–42 || W1
|- style="text-align:center; background-color:#bfb"
| 134 || August 29 || Marlins || 14–6 || Thornburg (2–0) || Conley (3–4) ||—|| Fenway Park || 36,628 || 92–42 || W2
|- style="text-align:center; background-color:#bfb;"
| 135 || August 30 || @ White Sox || 9–4 || Brasier (1–0) || Vieira (1–1) ||—|| Guaranteed Rate Field || 18,015 || 93–42 || W3
|- style="text-align:center; background-color:#fbb;"
| 136 || August 31 || @ White Sox || 1–6 || Covey (5–12) || Eovaldi (5–7) ||—|| Guaranteed Rate Field || 23,625 || 93–43 || L1
|-

|- style="text-align:center; background-color:#bfb;"
| 137 || September 1 || @ White Sox || 6–1 || Rodríguez (12–3) || Rodón (6–4) ||—|| Guaranteed Rate Field || 22,639 || 94–43 || W1
|- style="text-align:center; background-color:#fbb;"
| 138 || September 2 || @ White Sox || 0–8 || Shields (6–15) || Johnson (4–4) ||—|| Guaranteed Rate Field || 30,745 || 94–44 || L1
|- style="text-align:center; background-color:#bfb;"
| 139 || September 3 || @ Braves || 8–2 || Workman (3–0) || Toussaint (1–1) ||—|| SunTrust Park || 40,394 || 95–44 || W1
|- style="text-align:center; background-color:#bfb;"
| 140 || September 4 || @ Braves || 5–1 || Porcello (16–7) || Newcomb (11–8) ||—|| SunTrust Park || 35,333 || 96–44 || W2
|- style="text-align:center; background-color:#bfb;"
| 141 || September 5 || @ Braves || 9–8 || Workman (4–0) || Minter (4–3) || Kimbrel (38) || SunTrust Park || 28,386 || 97–44 || W3
|- style="text-align:center; background-color:#fbb"
| 142 || September 7 || Astros || 3–6 || Pressly (2–1) || Kelly (4–2) || Osuna (14) || Fenway Park || 36,930 || 97–45 || L1
|- style="text-align:center; background-color:#fbb"
| 143 || September 8 || Astros || 3–5 || Morton (14–3) || Rodríguez (12–4) || Osuna (15) || Fenway Park || 36,684 || 97–46 || L2
|- style="text-align:center; background-color:#bfb"
| 144 || September 9 || Astros || 6–5 || Kimbrel (5–1) || Rondón (2–3) ||—|| Fenway Park || 32,787 || 98–46 || W1
|- style="text-align:center; background-color:#039"
| 145 || September 11 || Blue Jays || 7–2 || Brasier (2–0) || Tepera (5–5) || — || Fenway Park || 34,747 || 99–46 || W2
|- style="text-align:center; background-color:#bfb"
| 146 || September 12 || Blue Jays || 1–0 || Price (15–6) || Sanchez (4–6) || Kimbrel (39) || Fenway Park || 35,178 || 100–46 || W3
|- style="text-align:center; background-color:#bfb"
| 147 || September 13 || Blue Jays || 4–3 || Workman (5–0) || Barnes (3–3) || Kimbrel (40) || Fenway Park || 36,427 || 101–46 || W4
|- style="text-align:center; background-color:#fbb"
| 148 || September 14 || Mets || 0–8 || Syndergaard (12–3) || Cuevas (0–1) ||—|| Fenway Park || 37,117 || 101–47 || L1
|- style="text-align:center; background-color:#bfb"
| 149 || September 15 || Mets || 5–3 || Porcello (17–7) || Sewald (0–6) || Kimbrel (41) || Fenway Park || 36,611 || 102–47 || W1
|- style="text-align:center; background-color:#bfb"
| 150 || September 16 || Mets || 4–3 || Workman (6–0) || Lugo (3–4) || Wright (1) || Fenway Park || 36,526 || 103–47 || W2
|- style="text-align:center; background-color:#fbb;"
| 151 || September 18 || @ Yankees || 2–3 || Green (8–2) || Workman (6–1) || Britton (6) || Yankee Stadium || 38,695 || 103–48 || L1
|- style="text-align:center; background-color:#fbb;"
| 152 || September 19 || @ Yankees || 1–10 || Severino (18–8) || Price (15–7) ||—|| Yankee Stadium || 43,297 || 103–49 || L2 
|- style="text-align:center; background-color:#090;"
| 153 || September 20 || @ Yankees || 11–6 || Wright (3–1) || Green (8–3) || — || Yankee Stadium || 47,351 || 104–49 || W1 
|- style="text-align:center; background-color:#bfb;"
| 154 || September 21 || @ Indians || 7–5 || Barnes (6–3) || Bieber (10–5) || Kimbrel (42) || Progressive Field || 27,892 || 105–49 || W2
|- style="text-align:center; background-color:#fbb;"
| 155 || September 22 || @ Indians || 4–5 (11) || Olson (2–1) || Pomeranz (2–6) ||—|| Progressive Field || 35,095 || 105–50 || L1
|- style="text-align:center; background-color:#fbb;"
| 156 || September 23 || @ Indians || 3–4 (11) || Tomlin (2–5) || Cuevas (0–2) ||—|| Progressive Field || 27,879 || 105–51 || L2
|- style="text-align:center; background-color:#bfb"
| 157 || September 24 || Orioles || 6–2 || Eovaldi (6–7) || Bundy (8–16) ||—|| Fenway Park || 35,619 || 106–51 || W1
|- style="text-align:center; background-color:#bbb
|—|| September 25 || Orioles || colspan=8|Postponed (rain). Makeup date September 26.
|- style="text-align:center; background-color:#bfb"
| 158 || September 26 (1) || Orioles || 19–3 || Price (16–7) || Meisinger (2–1) ||—|| Fenway Park || 33,577 || 107–51 || W2
|- style="text-align:center; background-color:#fbb"
| 159 || September 26 (2) || Orioles || 3–10 || Scott (3–2) || Barnes (6–4) || Fry (2) || Fenway Park || 34,445 || 107–52 || L1
|- style="text-align:center; background-color:#fbb"
| 160 || September 28 || Yankees || 6–11 || Happ (17–6) || Johnson (4–5) ||—|| Fenway Park || 36,779 || 107–53 || L2
|- style="text-align:center; background-color:#fbb"
| 161 || September 29 || Yankees || 5–8 || Lynn (10–10) || Rodríguez (12–5) || Chapman (32) || Fenway Park || 36,375 || 107–54 || L3
|- style="text-align:center; background-color:#bfb"
| 162 || September 30 || Yankees || 10–2 || Rodríguez (13–5) || Cessa (1–4) ||—|| Fenway Park || 36,201 || 108–54 || W1
|-

|Reference:

Postseason game log

|- style="text-align:center; background:#bfb;"
| 1 || October 5 || Yankees || 5–4 || Sale (1–0) || Happ (0–1) || Kimbrel (1) || Fenway Park || 39,059 || 1–0 || W1
|- style="text-align:center; background:#fbb;"
| 2 || October 6 || Yankees || 2–6 || Tanaka (1–0) || Price (0–1) ||—|| Fenway Park || 39,151 || 1–1 || L1
|- style="text-align:center; background:#bfb;"
| 3 || October 8 || @ Yankees || 16–1 || Eovaldi (1–0) || Severino (0–1) ||—|| Yankee Stadium || 49,657 || 2–1 || W1
|- style="text-align:center; background:#bfb;"
| 4 || October 9 || @ Yankees || 4–3 || Porcello (1–0) || Sabathia (0–1) || Kimbrel (2) || Yankee Stadium || 49,641 || 3–1 || W2
|- style="text-align:center;"
|colspan="11" style="background-color:#009900;color:white"|Red Sox Win Series 3–1
|-

|- style="text-align:center; background:#fbb;"
| 1 || October 13 || Astros || 2–7 || Verlander (1–0) || Kelly (0–1) ||—|| Fenway Park || 38,007 || 0–1 || L1
|- style="text-align:center; background:#bfb;"
| 2 || October 14 || Astros || 7–5 || Barnes (1–0) || Cole (0–1) || Kimbrel (1) || Fenway Park || 37,960 || 1–1 || W1
|- style="text-align:center; background:#bfb;"
| 3 || October 16 || @ Astros || 8–2 || Eovaldi (1–0) || Smith (0–1) ||—|| Minute Maid Park || 43,102 || 2–1 || W2
|- style="text-align:center; background:#bfb;"
| 4 || October 17 || @ Astros || 8–6 || Kelly (1–1) || James (0–1) || Kimbrel (2) || Minute Maid Park || 43,277 || 3–1 || W3
|- style="text-align:center; background:#bfb;"
| 5 || October 18 || @ Astros || 4–1 || Price (1–0) || Verlander (1–1) || Kimbrel (3) || Minute Maid Park || 43,210 || 4–1 || W4
|- style="text-align:center;"
|colspan="11" style="background-color:#009900;color:white"|Red Sox Win Series 4–1
|-

|- style="text-align:center; background:#bfb;"
| 1 || October 23 || Dodgers || 8–4 || Barnes (1–0) || Kershaw (0–1) ||—|| Fenway Park || 38,454 || 1–0 || W1
|- style="text-align:center; background:#bfb;"
| 2 || October 24 || Dodgers || 4–2 || Price (1–0) || Ryu (0–1) || Kimbrel (1) || Fenway Park || 38,644 || 2–0 || W2
|- style="text-align:center; background:#fbb;"
| 3 || October 26 || @ Dodgers || 2–3 (18) || Wood (1–0) || Eovaldi (0–1) ||—|| Dodger Stadium || 53,114 || 2–1 || L1
|- style="text-align:center; background:#bfb;"
| 4 || October 27 || @ Dodgers || 9–6 || Kelly (1–0) || Floro (0–1) ||—|| Dodger Stadium || 54,400 || 3–1 || W1
|- style="text-align:center; background:#bfb;"
| 5 || October 28 || @ Dodgers || 5–1 || Price (2–0) || Kershaw (0–2) ||—|| Dodger Stadium || 54,367 || 4–1 || W2
|- style="text-align:center;"
|colspan="11" style="background-color:#009900;color:white"|Red Sox win World Series 4–1
|-

Grand slams

 postseason game

Cycles

 Holt's cycle was the first in MLB postseason history.

Ejections

 postseason game

Source:

Alumni game
The team held an alumni game on May 27, before a home game against the Atlanta Braves; it was the Red Sox' first such game since 1993. Dwight Evans and Luis Tiant acted as managers, assisted by bench coaches Joe Morgan and Jim Rice, respectively. The four-inning exhibition was won by Tiant's team, as Julio Lugo hit a two-run homer off of Pedro Martínez for the only runs in the game. Other Red Sox alumni participating included Wade Boggs, Oil Can Boyd, Mike Greenwell, Bill Lee, Derek Lowe, Mike Lowell, and Troy O'Leary.

Detailed records

StatisticsPlease note only the statistics from playing with the Red Sox are included in this list.Postseason Batting

Postseason Pitching

Regular Season Batting
Note: G = Games played; AB = At bats; R = Runs scored; H = Hits; 2B = Doubles; 3B = Triples; HR = Home runs; RBI = Runs batted in; SB = Stolen bases; BB = Walks; AVG = Batting average; Ref. = Reference
Top ten batters shown. Qualified batters in bold.Top 10 hitters determined by fWAR:

Regular Season Pitching
Note: G = Games pitched; GS = Games started; W = Wins; L = Losses; SV = Saves; ERA = Earned run average; WHIP = Walks plus hits per inning pitched; IP = Innings pitched; H = Hits allowed; R = Total runs allowed; ER = Earned runs allowed; BB = Walks allowed; K = Strikeouts; Ref. = Reference
Top ten pitchers shown. Qualified pitchers in bold.Top 10 pitchers determined by fWAR':

Awards and honors

 Alex Cora finished second to Bob Melvin of the Oakland Athletics for the AL Manager of the Year Award.

Farm system

Source:

 Allegations of electronic sign stealing 
On January 7, 2020, The Athletic'' published a report alleging that the Red Sox broke MLB rules by using a video replay room during 2018 regular season games to decipher the signs of opposing catchers, according to three unnamed sources who were with the team that year. This news broke while the league was already investigating the Houston Astros for also allegedly stealing signs electronically during their 2017 season. Alex Cora, who managed the Red Sox in 2018, had served as bench coach for the Astros in 2017. MLB launched an investigation.

This was not the first time the Red Sox were investigated for alleged electronic sign stealing. During the 2017 season, they were fined by MLB for using an Apple Watch to relay stolen signs to hitters in games against the New York Yankees. On September 15, 2017, commissioner Rob Manfred had said in regards to the investigation into Boston's illicit use of an Apple Watch: "I have received absolute assurances from the Red Sox that there will be no future violations of this type."

On April 22, 2020, commissioner Manfred issued his report from the investigation, determining that the Red Sox replay operator had "utilized the game feeds in the replay room" to decode sign sequences but those actions were "limited in scope and impact", as the decoding only happened during some occurrences of the opposing team having a runner on second base and were not known to "then-Manager Alex Cora, the Red Sox coaching staff, the Red Sox front office, or most of the players". The video replay operator was suspended for the 2020 season and the team forfeited their second-round selection in the 2020 MLB draft. Cora was separately suspended for a year for his actions in the Houston situation.

See also
 List of Boston Red Sox team records

References

Further reading

External links
2018 Boston Red Sox at Baseball Reference
 2018 Boston Red Sox season at Official Site
2018 Boston Red Sox Media Guide

Boston Red Sox
Red Sox
Boston Red Sox
Boston Red Sox seasons
American League East champion seasons
American League champion seasons
World Series champion seasons